= .475 Linebaugh =

Revolver cartridge

- Type: Handgun
- Place of origin: United States

Production history
- Designer: John Linebaugh
- Designed: 1988
- Variants: .475 Linebaugh Long or .475 Linebaugh Maximum

Specifications
- Parent case: .45-70
- Case type: Semi-rimmed, straight
- Bullet diameter: .475 in (12.1 mm)
- Neck diameter: .504 in (12.8 mm)
- Base diameter: .504 in (12.8 mm)
- Rim diameter: .540 in (13.7 mm)
- Rim thickness: .065 in (1.7 mm)
- Case length: 1.4 in (36 mm)
- Overall length: 1.77 in (45 mm)
- Case capacity: 50.3 gr H_{2}O (3.26 cm^{3})
- Primer type: Large pistol
- Maximum pressure: 50,000 psi (340 MPa)

Ballistic performance
Bullet mass/type	Velocity	Energy
400 gr (26 g) J.F.N. Buffalo Bore	1,400 ft/s (430 m/s)	1,741 ft⋅lbf (2,360 J)
440 gr (29 g) E.W.N. Buffalo Bore	1,325 ft/s (404 m/s)	1,714 ft⋅lbf (2,324 J)
- Test barrel length: 5.5"; Source(s): "Cartridges of the World"

The .475 Linebaugh (12.1x36mmR) is a rimmed revolver cartridge developed by John Linebaugh in 1986 in response to the scarcity of the .348 Winchester brass required to form his .500 Linebaugh cartridge. The cartridge is based on the .45-70 Government case trimmed to 1.4 in (36 mm) and loaded with .475-inch-diameter (12.1 mm) bullets. While dimensionally similar to the older .45 Silhouette cartridge, the .475 Linebaugh is loaded to considerably higher pressures, resulting in significantly different ballistic performance.

The .475 Linebaugh was first announced in the May 1988 issue of Guns & Ammo in an article written by Ross Seyfried. In 1991, Linebaugh announced a 1.6 in (41 mm) variant of the .475 Linebaugh for use in converted Ruger .357 Maximum revolvers. This cartridge is known as the .475 Linebaugh Long or .475 Linebaugh Maximum, and produces somewhat greater ballistic performance than the shorter round.

== Usage ==
The .475 Linebaugh is intended primarily for hunting and defense against big game. The .475 is capable of propelling a 400-grain (26 g) bullet at a muzzle velocity of 1,400 feet per second (430 m/s), developing 1,741 foot-pounds (2,360 J) of muzzle energy from a 5.5 in (140 mm) barrel. These figures compare favorably to those of the popular .44 Magnum, which fires a 240-grain (16 g) bullet at 1,475 feet per second (450 m/s), producing 1,160 foot-pounds (1,570 J) of muzzle energy from a 7.5 in (190 mm) barrel. The .475 Linebaugh is ballistically comparable to the .454 Casull, .500 Linebaugh, and "Trapdoor level" loadings of the .45-70 Government, though it is less powerful than the .460 S&W Magnum, .500 Wyoming Express, .500 S&W Magnum, and .500 Bushwhacker rounds, as well as Linebaugh's own .475 and .500 Maximum cartridges. With the exception of the .500 Wyoming Express, however, the .475 Linebaugh is generally chambered in lighter and more compact revolvers than such "super magnum" cartridges, lending itself to easier carry and field use. This results in a relatively high power-to-weight ratio which, in the absence of a muzzle brake, often entails greater felt recoil than produced by heavier firearms chambered in more powerful cartridges.

In 2003, Ruger introduced the .480 Ruger, which is essentially a .475 Linebaugh shortened to 1.285 in (32.6 mm) with a marginally lower pressure ceiling (48,000 psi (330 MPa) for the .480 Ruger vs. 50,000 psi (340 MPa) for the .475 Linebaugh). The performance and recoil generated by the .480 Ruger with standard loadings are comparatively less than those of the .475 Linebaugh. Furthermore, just as the .38 Special cartridge will chamber and fire in revolvers chambered for the more powerful .357 Magnum, the .480 Ruger will chamber and fire in revolvers chambered for the .475 Linebaugh. However, given their comparable operating pressures, the two rounds are far closer in performance than such a comparison would seem to suggest.

The .475 Linebaugh remains a relatively obscure cartridge, owing in part to the commercial success of Smith & Wesson's more powerful .460 S&W Magnum and .500 S&W Magnum cartridges. However, while the .475 Linebaugh was once an exclusively custom proposition, both the Freedom Arms Model 83 and the Magnum Research BFR are currently available in the cartridge.

== See also ==
- .500 Linebaugh
- 12 mm caliber
- List of rimmed cartridges
- List of handgun cartridges
