= 12 mm caliber =

Firearm cartridge classification

12 mm
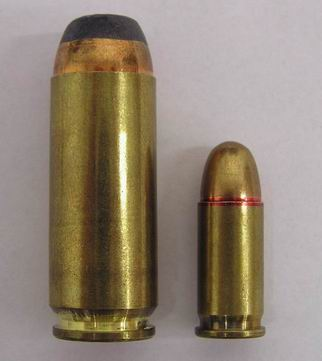
- Example of a 12 mm cartridge, a .50 Action Express (left) next to a .32 ACP (right) for comparison
- Firearm cartridges
- « 10 mm, 11 mm 12 mm 13 mm, 14 mm »

This is a list of firearm cartridges which have bullets in the 12 millimetres (0.47 in) to 12.99 millimetres (0.511 in) range.

- Length refers to the cartridge case length.
- OAL refers to the overall length of the cartridge.
- Bullet refers to the diameter of the bullet.

Some measurements are in millimetres, while others are measured in inches.

== Pistol cartridges ==
Name	Bullet	Case type	Case length	Rim	Base	Shoulder	Neck	OAL
.475 Wildey Magnum	12.1 (.475)	Rebated straight walled	30.4 (1.198)	12.0 (.473)	12.7 (.501)	-	12.50 (.493)	40.00 (1.575)
.50 Action Express	12.7 (.500)	Rebated straight walled	32.64 (1.285)	13.06 (.514)	13.89 (.547)	-	13.72 (.540)	40.89 (1.610)
.50 GI	12.7 (.500)	Rebated straight walled	22.81 (.899)	12.19 (.480)	13.36 (.526)	-	13.36 (.526)	31.01 (1.221)

== Revolver cartridges ==
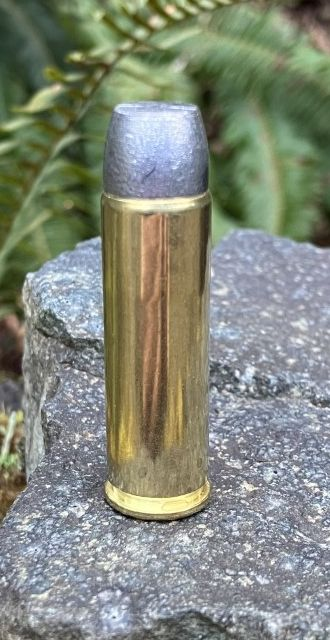
A .500 S&W Magnum cartridge

Name	Bullet	Case length	Rim	Base	Shoulder	Neck	OAL
.480 Ruger	12.065 (.475)	32.639 (1.285)	13.767 (.542)	12.802 (.504)	-	12.802 (.504)	41.91 (1.650)
.475 Linebaugh	12.08 (.476)	35.16 (1.384)	13.77 (.542)	12.80 (.504)	-	12.80 (.504)	44.43 (1.749)
.500 S&W Special	12.7 (.500)	32.4 (1.274)	14.12 (.556)	13.36 (.526)	-	13.36 (.526)	44 (1.733)
.500 Wyoming Express	12.7 (.500)	35 (1.37)	13.8 (.543)	13.7 (.541)	-	-	44.8 (1.765)
.500 Linebaugh	12.95 (.510)	35.69 (1.405)	15.49 (.610)	14.05 (.553)	-	13.72 (.540)	44.58 (1.755)
.500 S&W Magnum	12.7 (.500)	41.275 (1.625)	14.12 (.556)	13.36 (.526)	-	13.36 (.526)	53.34 (2.10)
.500 Bushwhacker	12.7 (.500)	62 (2.45)	14.12 (.556)	13.36 (.526)	-	13.36 (.526)	75 (2.95)

== Rifle cartridges ==
Name	Bullet	Case type	Case length	Rim	Base	Shoulder	Neck	OAL	Primer
.475 A&M Magnum	12.07 (.475)	Belted, bottleneck	73.66 (2.90)	13.54 (.533)	14.83 (.584)	14.22 (.560)	12.75 (.502)	95.25 (3.75)	Boxer large rifle
.470 Capstick	12.07 (.475)	-	72.39 (2.85)	13.51 (.532)	13.03 (.513)	-	12.67 (.499)	92.71 (3.65)	-
.476 Nitro Express	12.09 (.476)	Rimmed, bottleneck	76.2 (3.00)	16.33 (.643)	14.48 (.570)	13.46 (.530)	12.9 (.508)	95.76 (3.77)	Berdan 6.45 (0.254)
.470 Nitro Express	12.27 (.483)	Rimmed, bottleneck	88.65 (3.25)	16.41 (.646)	14.53 (.572)	13.41 (.528)	12.7 (.500)	108.2 (4.26)	Berdan 6.45 (0.254)
.475 No. 2 Nitro Express	12.27 (.483)	Rimmed, bottleneck	82.55 (3.49)	16.86 (.665)	14.63 (.576)	13.89 (.547)	12.95 (.510)	98.04 (3.86)	Berdan 6.45 (0.254)
.475 Nitro Express	12.27 (.483)	Rimmed, straight	82.55 (3.25)	16.41 (.646)	14.53 (.572)	-	13.41 (.528)	98.04 (3.86)	Berdan 6.38 (0.251)
.577/.500 Magnum Nitro Express	12.7 (.500)	Rimmed, bottleneck	80 (3.13)	18.2 (.717)	16.4 (.645)	14.9 (.585)	13.4 (.526)	95 (3.74)	Berdan 6.38 (0.251)
.50 Beowulf	12.7 (.500)	Rebated-rim, straight	42 (1.65)	11.3 (.445)	13.6 (.535)	-	13.3 (.525)	54 (2.125)	Boxer
.50 Alaskan	12.95 (.510)	Rimmed, straight	53 (2.10)	15.5 (.610)	14 (.553)	-	13.6 (.536)	53 (2.10)	
.500 Auto Max	12.7 (.500)	Rimless, straight	14.12 (.556)	13.36 (.526)	-	13.36 (.526)	53.34 (2.10)		
.505 Gibbs	12.8 (.505)	Rimless, bottleneck	80.0 (3.150)	-	16.3 (.640)	16.3 (.640)	13.7 (.538)	97.8 (3.850)	
.500 No. 2 Express (.577/500)	12.88 (.507)	Rimmed, bottleneck	71.37 (2.81)	18.44 (.726)	16.28 (.641)	14.22 (.560)	13.67 (.538)	86.36 (3.40)	Berdan 6.38 (0.251)
.500 Jeffery	12.95 (.510)	Rebated-rim, bottleneck	70 (2.75)	14.6 (.575)	15.7 (.619)	15.4 (.607)	13.7 (.538)	87.88 (3.46)	
.50 BMG (12.7×99mm NATO)	12.95 (.510)	-	99.31 (3.91)	20.42 (.804)	20.42 (.804)	18.82 (.741)	14.22 (.560)	138.43 (5.45)	Boxer
.510 DTC Europ (.50 DTC)	12.95 (.510)	-	96.77 (3.81)	-	-	19.304 (.760)	-	135.89 (5.35)	Boxer
.510 Whisper	12.95 (.510)	-	47.63 (1.875)	14.94 (.588)	14.91 (.587)	14.91 (.587)	13.94 (.549)	84.84 (3.34)	Boxer
12.7×108mm	12.98 (.511)	-	108 (4.3)	21.70 (0.854)	21.75 (0.856)	18.90 (0.744)	13.95 (0.549)	147.50 (5.807)	-
12.7×55mm STs-130	13.01 (.512)	-	54.91 (2.16)	-	14.86 (0.585)	-	13.76 (0.54)	94 (3.7)	-
12.7x81mmSR (.50 British)	13.1 (.516)	-	81.2 (3.20)	19.6 (.772)	18.35 (.722)	16.3 (.642)	13.8 (.543)	108.7 (4.28)	-

Note: The .50 Sharps, Winchester, and US Government cartridges are actually of 13 mm caliber

== See also ==
- .50 caliber handguns
