= Taurus Raging Bull =

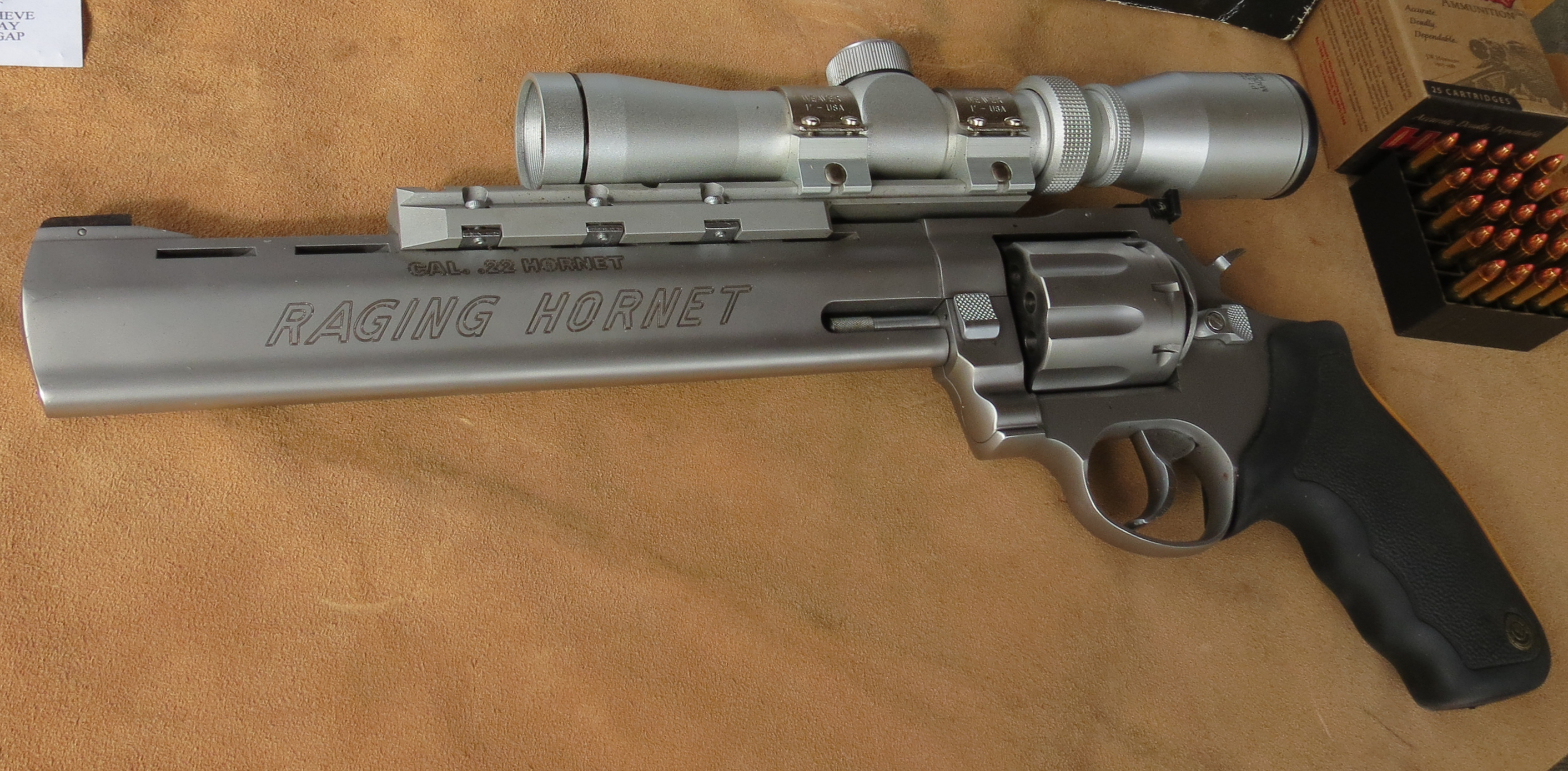
- Taurus Raging Hornet chambered in .22 Hornet
- Type: Revolver
- Place of origin: Brazil

Production history
- Produced: 1997−2019 (Raging Bull line); 2019−present (Raging Hunter line)

Specifications
- Mass: 0.80–2.20 kg (1.8–4.9 lb)
- Length: 254–419 mm (10–16.5 in)
- Barrel length: 50.8–254 mm (2–10 in)
- Cartridge: .218 Bee (discontinued); .22 Hornet (discontinued); .30 Carbine (discontinued); .357 Magnum (Raging Hunter only); .41 Magnum (discontinued); .44 Magnum; .45 Colt (discontinued); .454 Casull; .45 Colt/.410 shot shell (Raging Judge only, discontinued); .45 Colt/.454 Casull/.410 shot shell (Raging Judge Magnum only, discontinued); .460 S&W Magnum (Raging Hunter only); .480 Ruger (discontinued); .500 S&W Magnum
- Action: Double action / single action
- Feed system: Revolving cylinder: 5 rounds (.45/.454/.410, .454, .480, .500 & 28 gauge); 6 rounds (.41, .44 & .45 LC); 7 rounds (.357); 8 rounds (.218, .22 and .30)

The Raging Bull is a DA/SA, large-frame revolver manufactured by the Brazilian Taurus International firearm company beginning in 1997. The Raging Bull has a dual-locking design built on a heavy frame, allowing the revolver to easily fire extremely powerful loads. Because of the powerful nature of these handguns, the Raging Bull has a ported barrel and a cushioned rubber grip to mitigate harsh recoil. As of 2024, it is the most powerful revolver line ever offered by Taurus.

It was chambered for a number of powerful cartridges, notably the .44 Magnum and .454 Casull, however many other powerful chamberings were offered, including the .41 Magnum, .480 Ruger, .218 Bee, .22 Hornet and .30 Carbine. The Raging Bull line was discontinued in 2019, however, that same year it was replaced by the Raging Hunter line. The Raging Hunter series is similar, but lighter and it offers a built-in Picatinny rail for scope-mounting. The Raging Hunter series is chambered in .500 S&W Magnum, .454 Casull, .44 Magnum, .357 Magnum and .460 S&W Magnum, which is a new offering for Taurus.

== Design ==
In order to highlight the strength and power of the revolver, the line was originally named "Raging Bull", as both a reference to the legendary boxer Jake LaMotta, but also a reference to the Taurus constellation, the company's namesake. The Raging line is marketed as a hunter's sidearm because it is a potent weapon with plenty of stopping power. The .454 Casull cartridge has been used to hunt animals as large as Cape Buffalo.

Prior to the Raging Hunter, most Raging Bull variants could still mount commercial optical sights and lasers with the aid of an optional screw-on Picatinny rail. The Raging Bull line also features a distinctive red backstrap on the rubber grip that reduces felt recoil. However, the smaller chamberings (the Raging Hornet, Raging Bee and Raging Thirty) have yellow rubber insert strips instead. Finishes offered for the Raging Bull line include stainless steel, matte stainless steel, nickel-plated, polished blued and matte black. Barrel options on the Raging Bull included 2", 4", 6", 8", 10". All models have ported barrels, except for the 22H, 30C, 513, 528 and Ultralite. All models also have fixed front sights and adjustable rear sights.

Functionally, the Raging Bull has a manually operated front cylinder latch (similar to a Dan Wesson revolver), and the front release is located on the crane. Front cylinder latches are required for such high-powered double-action revolvers and are found on the Ruger Super Redhawk and the S&W Model 500 revolver, but, unlike the Raging line, are actuated by the rear cylinder latch, which performs two functions. The manually operated latch on the Raging Bull is equally strong but simpler (and thus less expensive to produce) but requires two hands to open the cylinder.

=== Raging Hunter ===
In 2019, the Raging Bull was replaced by the Raging Hunter, which is similar but not identical; it has focus on hunting, evidenced by the built-in accessory rail. The Raging Hunter is a series of revolvers developed by Taurus in 2019, chambered for .357 Magnum, .38 Special +P and .44 Magnum. A .454 Casull variant was created in 2020, and another for .460 S&W Magnum in 2021. The Raging Hunter in .460 offers a two-tone 10.5" barrel variant with a built-in muzzle brake, fiber optic front and rear sights and a bottom Picatinny rail. The Raging Hunter won "handgun of the year in American Hunter's 2019 Golden Bullseye Awards." Raging Hunter revolvers are fitted with a Picatinny rail, and may have a barrel length of 5.12 inches (130 mm), 6.75 inches (171 mm), or 8.37 inches (213 mm), allowing for an overall length of 11.6 inches (290 mm), 13.2 inches (340 mm), or 14.9 inches (380 mm), respectively. The Raging Hunter weighs 54 ounces (1.5 kg).

== Variants ==
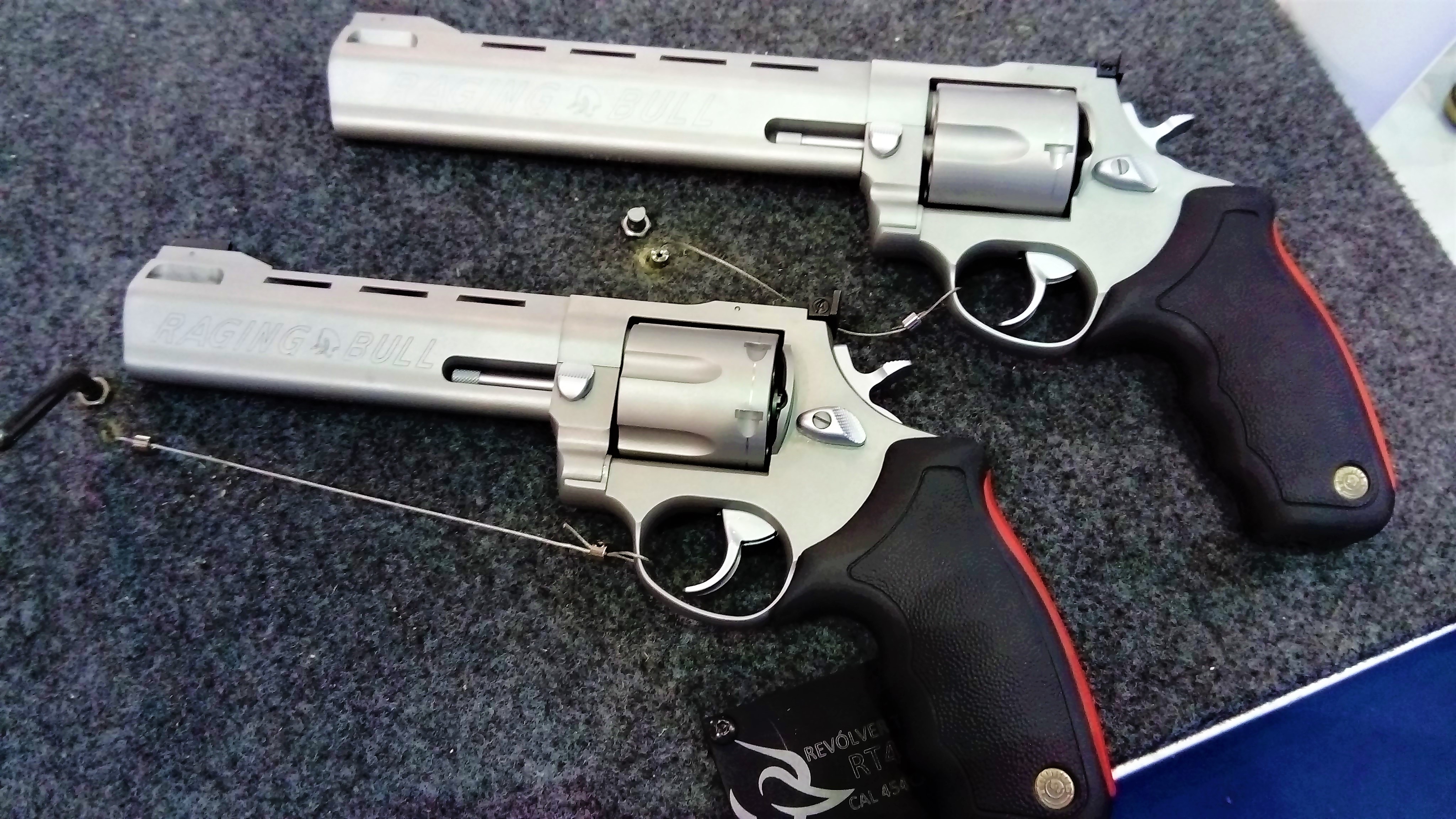
Pair of Raging Bulls, the bottom is a .44 Magnum with a 6.5" barrel and the top is a .454 Casull with an 8 3/8" barrel.

The Raging Bull comes in several models, classified by caliber. Additionally, each model has its own barrel length and metal finish options.

=== Current ===
- Raging Hunter 500 Black: 5-round .500 S&W Magnum caliber, can also fire the shorter .500 S&W Special. Available in 8.37, 6.75, 5.12-inch barrel lengths.
  - Raging Hunter 500 Two Tone: Same as the above but with two-tone finish. Available in 8.37, 6.75, 5.12-inch barrel lengths.
- Raging Hunter 460 Black: 5-round .460 S&W Magnum caliber, can also fire .454 Casull and .45 Colt. Available in 8.37, 6.75 and 5.12-inch barrel lengths.
  - Raging Hunter 460 Two Tone: Same as the above but with two-tone finish. Available in 10, 8.37, 6.75 and 5.12-inch barrel lengths.
- Raging Hunter .454: 5-round .454 Casull chambering, can also fire .45 Colt. Available in 8.37, 6.75 and 5.12-inch barrel lengths.
  - Raging Hunter .454 Two Tone: Same as the above but with two-tone finish. Available in 8.37, 6.75 and 5.12-inch barrel lengths.
- Raging Hunter .44: 6-round .44 Magnum caliber, can also fire the .44 Special. Available in 8.37, 6.75 and 5.12-inch barrel lengths.
  - Raging Hunter .44 Two Tone: Same as the above but with two-tone finish. Available in 8.37, 6.75 and 5.12-inch barrel lengths.
- Raging Hunter .357: 7-round .357 Magnum chambering, can also fire .38 Special. Available in 8.37, 6.75 and 5.12-inch barrel lengths.
  - Raging Hunter .357 Two Tone: Same as the above but with two-tone finish. Available in 8.37, 6.75 and 5.12-inch barrel lengths.

=== Discontinued Raging Bull models ===
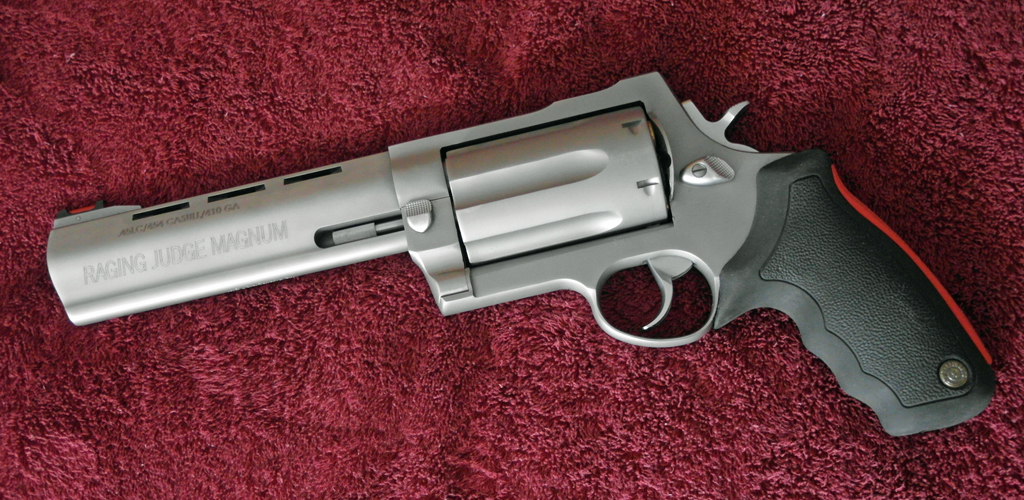
Taurus Raging Judge chambered in .454 Casull/.410/.45 Long Colt.

- Model 444: .44 Magnum caliber, can also fire the shorter .44 Special.
  - Model 444 Ultralite: Compact .44 with a 4-inch barrel. Blued and titanium finishes only.
- Model 454: .454 Casull caliber, can also fire the shorter .45 Colt.
- Model 513 (Raging Judge Magnum): .454 Casull, .45 Colt, .410 shot shell — six round cylinder
- Model 218 (Raging Bee): .218 Bee caliber, 10" barrel. Stainless steel only.
- Model 22H (Raging Hornet): .22 Hornet caliber, 10" barrel. Stainless steel only.
- Model 30C (Raging Thirty): .30 Carbine caliber, 10" barrel. Stainless steel only.
- Model 416: .41 Magnum caliber.
- Model 45: .45 Colt caliber only and featured a six-round cylinder
- Model 480: .480 Ruger caliber.
- Model 500: .500 S&W Magnum caliber, can also fire the shorter .500 S&W Special.
- Model 513 Ultralite (Raging Judge Magnum): .454 Casull, .45 Colt, .410 shot shell - featured a lightweight frame, 3-inch barrel and 7-round cylinder.
- Model 528 (Raging Judge XXVIII): 28 gauge shot shell (Prototypes built; never released)
