= .500 Bushwhacker =

Revolver cartridge designed by James and Keith Tow

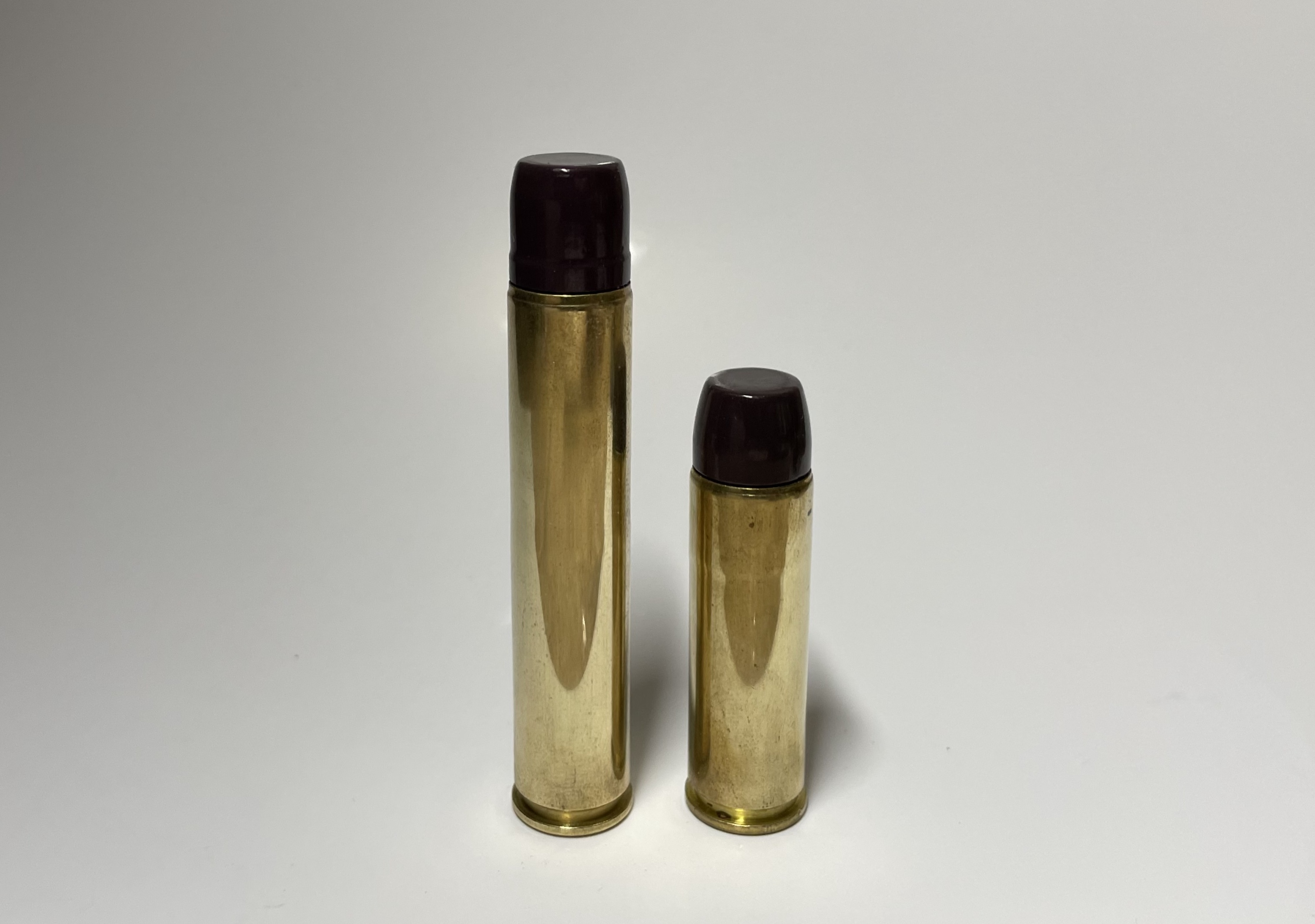
- Comparison of the .500 Bushwhacker (L) to the .500 S&W cartridge (R)
- Type: Handgun
- Place of origin: United States

Production history
- Designer: James Tow and Keith Tow
- Designed: 2021
- Manufacturer: TII Armory
- Produced: 2022–present
- Variants: .500 Bushwhacker Magnum

Specifications
- Parent case: .375 Ruger
- Case type: Semi-rimmed, straight
- Bullet diameter: .500 in (12.7 mm)
- Neck diameter: .525 in (13.3 mm)
- Base diameter: .530 in (13.5 mm)
- Rim diameter: .560 in (14.2 mm)
- Rim thickness: .059 in (1.5 mm)
- Case length: 2.45 in (62 mm)
- Overall length: 2.95 in (75 mm)
- Rifling twist: 1 in 15 in (380 mm)
- Primer type: Large rifle
- Maximum pressure: 60,000 psi

Ballistic performance
Bullet mass/type	Velocity	Energy
275 gr (18 g) TII Barnes XPB	2550 ft/s - 10in 2700 ft/s -14in	3970 ft⋅lbf - 10in 4451 ft⋅lbf - 14in
310 gr (20 g) TII Bengal WFNGC	2550 ft/s - 10in 2700 ft/s - 14in	4476 ft⋅lbf - 10in 5018 ft⋅lbf - 14in
340 gr (22 g) TII CEB Handgun Raptor	2350 ft/s - 10in 2450 ft/s - 14in	4169 ft⋅lbf - 10in 4531 ft⋅lbf - 14in
400 gr (26 g) TII Bengal WLFNGC	2250 ft/s - 10in 2350 ft/s - 14in	4496 ft⋅lbf - 10in 4905 ft⋅lbf - 14in
- Test barrel length: 10 in to 14 in Sources: TII Armory (275 gr), (310 gr), (340 gr) (400 gr), (510 gr),

The .500 Bushwhacker is a .50 caliber semi-rimmed revolver cartridge developed by TII Armory for the Magnum Research BFR revolvers. It is currently the most powerful revolver cartridge in the world, offering a similar level of ballistic performance to African dangerous game rifles, such as the .404 Jeffery and .450/400 Nitro Express, yet from standard length handgun barrels. Given comparable barrel lengths, it is nearly twice as powerful as the .500 S&W Magnum. A 10-inch barrel revolver chambered for the cartridge is capable of penetrating 103 inches of 10% Clear Ballistics gel. A 24-inch barrel rifle chambered for the round can penetrate 127 inches of the same medium. A 14-inch .500 Bushwhacker revolver can exceed 3,000 ft/s (914.4 m/s) with select loads.

== Cartridge history and variants ==
Brothers James Tow and Keith Tow of Halsey, Oregon developed the .500 Bushwhacker in 2021 to produce a repeating handgun capable of ethically harvesting dangerous game. They initially used the .375 Ruger for a parent case, fireforming the brass cylindrical and threading the bases for rims. The result was a cartridge that is essentially a lengthened .500 S&W Magnum. New manufactured brass is produced by the Bertram Bullet Company.

In 2025, the creators of the .500 Bushwhacker introduced the .500 Bushwhacker Magnum (also known as the .500 Bushwhacker No. 2, the .500 Bushwhacker Belted, or the .500 BWM). This is a belted variant of the original .500 Bushwhacker cartridge that is compatible with single action revolvers and a greater variety of rifle action types than the original version of the .500 Bushwhacker.

== Design, specifications, and use ==
The .500 Bushwhacker is designed to operate at comparable chamber pressures to the .500 S&W Magnum. Since the case is simply a lengthened version of the .500 S&W Magnum, the cylinder wall thickness remains the same on a firearm converted to the larger cartridge. Accordingly, the same pressure level can safely be maintained in firearms capable of accommodating the additional cartridge length. Firearms chambered in the .500 Bushwhacker are also capable of firing .500 S&W Magnum, .500 S&W Special, and .500 JRH ammunition. Firearms chambered in the .500 Bushwhacker No. 2 variant of the round can also fire .500 Wyoming Express ammunition.

To ensure manageable recoil in converted revolvers, all .500 Bushwhacker conversions produced by TII Armory include the installation of a large rifle-style muzzle brake.

Since the .500 Bushwhacker is capable of firing equivalent weight bullets at nearly twice the velocity of other large bore handgun cartridges, such as the .480 Ruger and .500 Linebaugh, it is advisable that monolithic bullets be used for dangerous game hunting, so as to guard against bullet failures.

Commercial loadings of the .500 Bushwhacker outperform all loadings of the .45-70 Government and the .458 Winchester Magnum, making the cartridge not only the most powerful revolver round but also very capable in the context of rifle cartridges. Given equivalent barrel lengths, it is quite similar in performance to the .500 Nitro Express and the .458 Lott, especially if +L loads of extended cartridge length are used.

== In popular culture ==
The Finals, a first-person shooter released in 2023, added a .500 Bushwhacker revolver, the BFR Titan, to its in-game lineup in a September 2025 update. The weapon features a five-port muzzle brake like those installed on .500 Bushwhacker conversions by TII Armory, though it also includes a stylized rib and various finish options that are not reflective of real-world firearms.

== See also ==
- 12 mm caliber
- List of handgun cartridges
- Table of handgun and rifle cartridges
