= Magnum Research BFR =

BFR
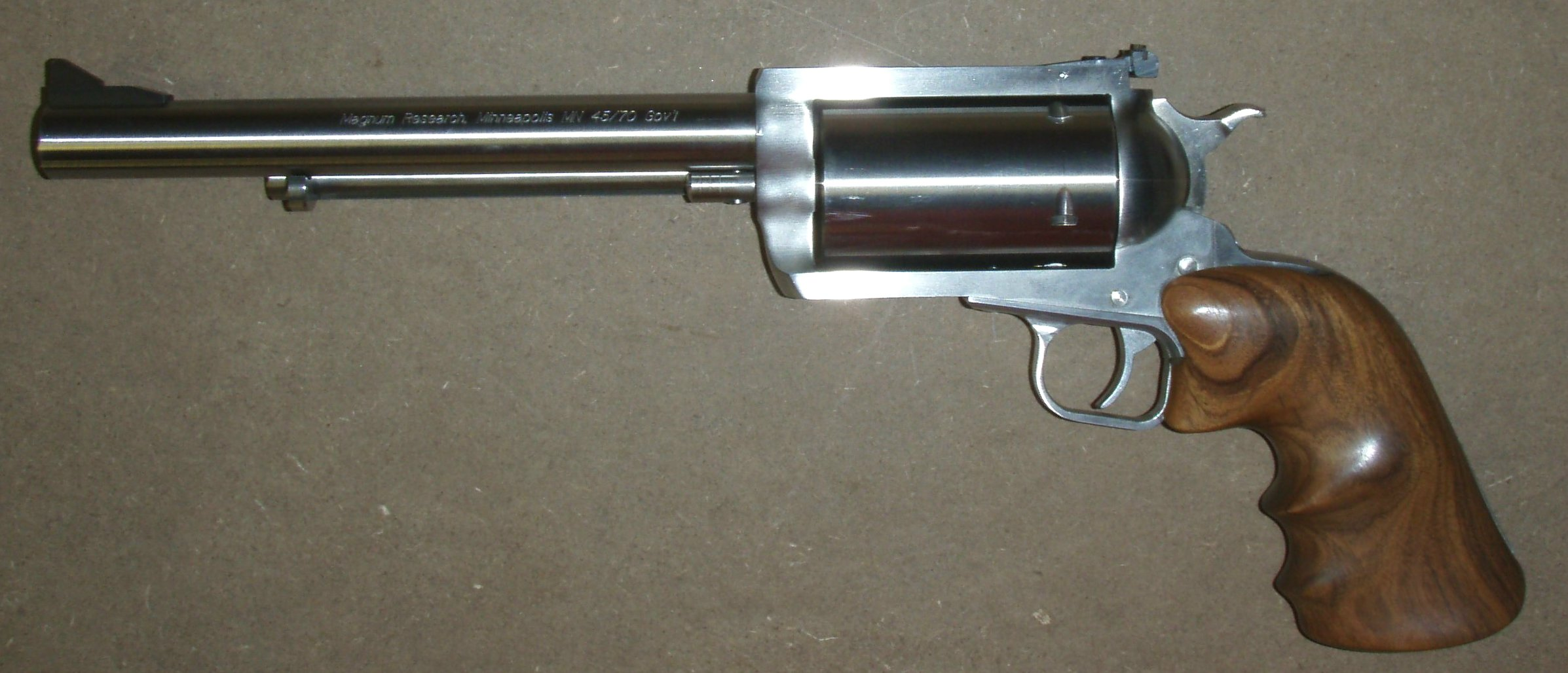
- A BFR chambered in .45–70 Govt. with custom grips
- Type: Revolver
- Place of origin: United States

Production history
- Designer: Magnum Research
- Manufacturer: Magnum Research
- Unit cost: US$1,149

Specifications
- Mass: 3.6–5.3 lb (1,600–2,400 g)
- Length: 11.75–17.5 inches (298–444 mm)
- Barrel length: 5.5 inches (140 mm) and 6.5 inches (170 mm) (short cylinder only), 7.5 inches (190 mm), or 10 inches (250 mm)
- Width: 1.75 inches (44 mm)
- Height: 6 inches (150 mm)
- Cartridge: Various, see Available cartridges
- Action: Single action revolver
- Feed system: 5-round or 6-round cylinder

The Magnum Research BFR is a single-action revolver manufactured by Magnum Research. Modeled after the Ruger Blackhawk, it is constructed of stainless steel and chambered for a number of powerful handgun cartridges, such as .460 S&W Magnum and .500 S&W Magnum; popular rifle chamberings, including .30–30 WCF, .444 Marlin, and .45-70 Government; and even .410 bore shotshells. Notably, the BFR platform has also served as the basis for custom caliber conversions to 19th century big game cartridges such as the .50–110 WCF and .50-90 Sharps, as well as the .500 Bushwhacker, which is currently considered to be the most powerful handgun cartridge in the world in terms of muzzle energy. The name "BFR" originally stood for "Brainerd’s First Revolver", in reference to Brainerd, Minnesota, where the early BFRs were manufactured. Officially the acronym now stands for "Biggest, Finest Revolver", though it was rebranded for a time as the "Big Frame Revolver" after Magnum Research's 2010 acquisition by Kahr Arms.

== Available cartridges ==
The BFR comes in two basic models, one with a long cylinder for larger rifle cartridges, and one with a more traditional revolver cylinder length (called "short" by Magnum Research). Some models that use identical bores, such as the .45-70 Government and .450 Marlin, can be made with two cylinders for the same gun.

The BFR revolvers were originally made by D-MAX in Springfield, South Dakota, until Magnum Research bought them out.

=== Long cylinder ===
- .30-30 Winchester
- .350 Legend
- .360 Buckhammer
- .444 Marlin
- .45 Colt/.410 (Not available in California due to legal restrictions)
- .45-70 Government
- .450 Marlin
- .460 S&W Magnum
- .500 S&W Magnum
- .50 Beowulf
- .500 Bushwhacker

=== Short cylinder ===
- .22 Hornet (discontinued)
- .357 Magnum
- .44 Remington Magnum
- .454 Casull
- .480 Ruger/.475 Linebaugh
- .50 Action Express
- .500 JRH
- .500 Linebaugh

== Gallery ==
A BFR chambered in .44 Magnum with Bisley grips

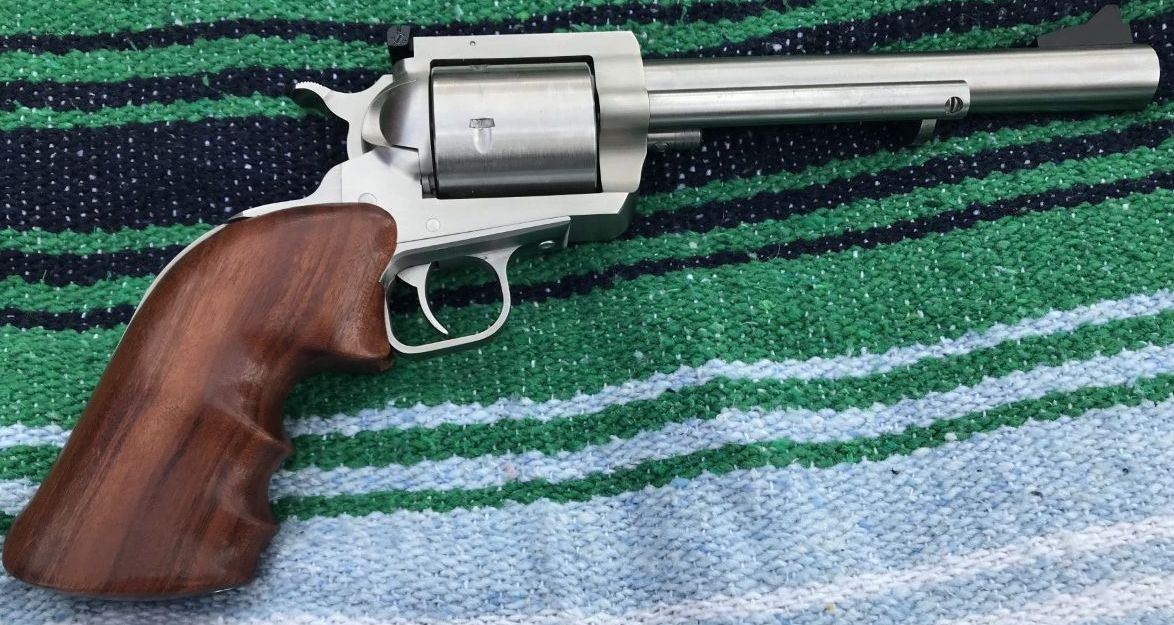
A BFR chambered in .50 AE

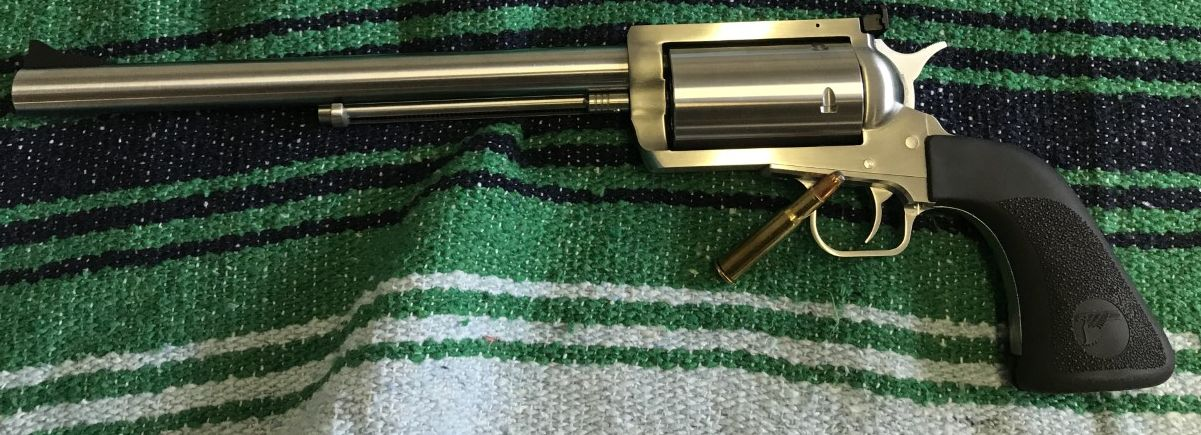
A BFR chambered in .30-30 WCF

A .30-30 WCF cartridge being loaded into a BFR

== See also ==
- Desert Eagle
- List of firearms
