= Halsey, Oregon =

- City
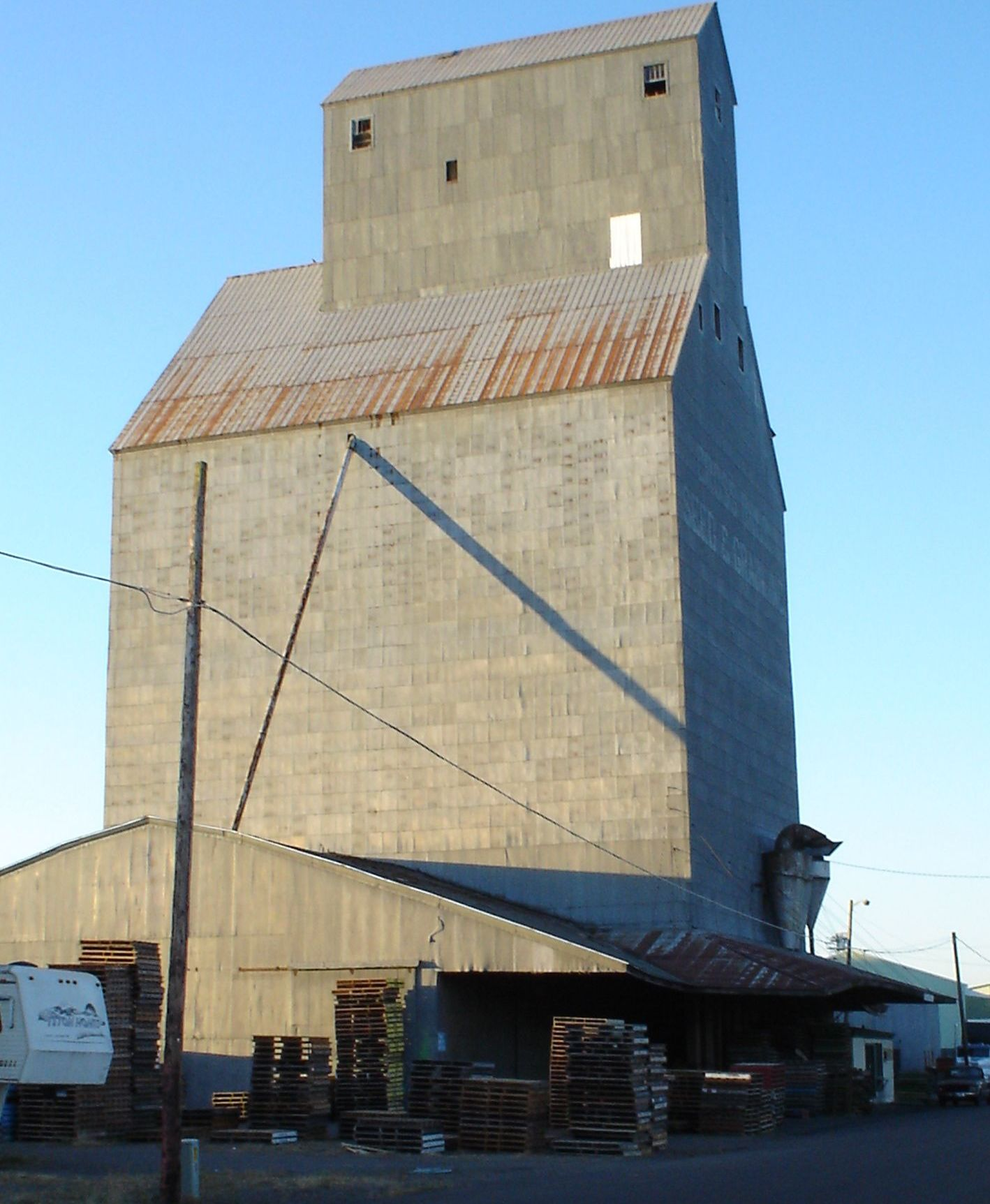
- Grass seed elevator in Halsey

- Location in Oregon
- Coordinates: 44°22′58″N 123°06′34″W
- Country: United States
- State: Oregon
- County: Linn
- Incorporated: 1876 (founded 1872)

Government
  - Mayor: Jerry Lachenbruch

Area
  - Total: 0.56 sq mi (1.45 km^{2})
  - Land: 0.56 sq mi (1.45 km^{2})
  - Water: 0 sq mi (0.00 km^{2})
- Elevation: 289 ft (88 m)

Population (2020)
  - Total: 962
  - Density: 1,717.4/sq mi (663.11/km^{2})
- Time zone: UTC-8 (Pacific)
  - Summer (DST): UTC-7 (Pacific)
- ZIP code: 97348
- Area code: 541
- FIPS code: 41-31750
- GNIS feature ID: 2410690
- Website: www.halseyor.gov

Halsey is a city in Linn County, Oregon, United States. As of the 2020 census, Halsey had a population of 962.

== History ==
The city was founded in 1872, and legally incorporated by the Oregon Legislative Assembly on October 20, 1876. The city takes its name from William L. Halsey, who was at the time vice-president of Oregon & California Railroad.

On July 31, 1903 most of the city's downtown core burned to the ground, after a fire started at the J. L. Bishur Creamery.

The city's iconic grain elevator was built in 1955 and stood at a height of 180 feet. It was partially demolished in December 2012 over concerns of structural integrity.

In 2022, the most powerful handgun cartridge in the world, the .500 Bushwhacker, was developed and introduced by Halsey residents James Tow and Keith Tow.

== Geography ==
According to the United States Census Bureau, the city has a total area of 0.56 square miles (1.45 km^{2}), all land.

Climate

Climate data for Halsey, Oregon
| Month | Jan | Feb | Mar | Apr | May | Jun | Jul | Aug | Sep | Oct | Nov | Dec | Year |
|---|---|---|---|---|---|---|---|---|---|---|---|---|---|
| Mean daily maximum °F (°C) | 49 (9) | 49 (9) | 53 (12) | 58 (14) | 65 (18) | 72 (22) | 81 (27) | 83 (28) | 76 (24) | 64 (18) | 52 (11) | 46 (8) | 62 (17) |
| Mean daily minimum °F (°C) | 35 (2) | 35 (2) | 36 (2) | 39 (4) | 44 (7) | 49 (9) | 53 (12) | 55 (13) | 51 (11) | 45 (7) | 39 (4) | 34 (1) | 43 (6) |
| Average precipitation inches (mm) | 6.4 (160) | 5.4 (140) | 6.6 (170) | 4.8 (120) | 2.8 (71) | 1.6 (41) | 0.2 (5.1) | 0.2 (5.1) | 2.0 (51) | 4.4 (110) | 6.7 (170) | 7.7 (200) | 48.8 (1,243.2) |
| Average precipitation days | 11 | 11 | 13 | 10 | 7 | 5 | 1 | 1 | 4 | 9 | 12 | 12 | 96 |
| Average snowy days | 1 | 2 | 1 | 0 | 0 | 0 | 0 | 0 | 0 | 0 | 0 | 2 | 6 |
Source: https://www.weatherwx.com/climate-averages/or/halsey.html

== Demographics ==
Historical population
| Census | Pop. | Note | %± |
|---|---|---|---|
| 1880 | 306 | | — |
| 1890 | 270 | | −11.8% |
| 1900 | 294 | | 8.9% |
| 1910 | 337 | | 14.6% |
| 1920 | 339 | | 0.6% |
| 1930 | 300 | | −11.5% |
| 1940 | 305 | | 1.7% |
| 1950 | 388 | | 27.2% |
| 1960 | 404 | | 4.1% |
| 1970 | 467 | | 15.6% |
| 1980 | 693 | | 48.4% |
| 1990 | 667 | | −3.8% |
| 2000 | 724 | | 8.5% |
| 2010 | 904 | | 24.9% |
| 2020 | 962 | | 6.4% |
U.S. Decennial Census

=== 2020 census ===
As of the 2020 census, Halsey had a population of 962. The median age was 35.2 years. 26.7% of residents were under the age of 18 and 13.4% of residents were 65 years of age or older. For every 100 females there were 110.0 males, and for every 100 females age 18 and over there were 106.7 males age 18 and over.

0% of residents lived in urban areas, while 100.0% lived in rural areas.

There were 343 households in Halsey, of which 40.8% had children under the age of 18 living in them. Of all households, 56.9% were married-couple households, 18.1% were households with a male householder and no spouse or partner present, and 15.5% were households with a female householder and no spouse or partner present. About 15.2% of all households were made up of individuals and 7.6% had someone living alone who was 65 years of age or older.

There were 349 housing units, of which 1.7% were vacant. Among occupied housing units, 75.2% were owner-occupied and 24.8% were renter-occupied. The homeowner vacancy rate was <0.1% and the rental vacancy rate was <0.1%.

Racial composition as of the 2020 census
| Race | Number | Percent |
|---|---|---|
| White | 848 | 88.1% |
| Black or African American | 2 | 0.2% |
| American Indian and Alaska Native | 9 | 0.9% |
| Asian | 5 | 0.5% |
| Native Hawaiian and Other Pacific Islander | 4 | 0.4% |
| Some other race | 27 | 2.8% |
| Two or more races | 67 | 7.0% |
| Hispanic or Latino (of any race) | 86 | 8.9% |

=== 2010 census ===
As of the census of 2010, there were 904 people, 305 households, and 244 families living in the city. The population density was 1,614.3 inhabitants per square mile (623.3/km^{2}). There were 334 housing units at an average density of 596.4 per square mile (230.3/km^{2}). The racial makeup of the city was 94.4% White, 0.3% African American, 0.6% Native American, 0.6% Asian, 0.1% Pacific Islander, 0.4% from other races, and 3.7% from two or more races. Hispanic or Latino of any race were 4.9% of the population.

There were 305 households, of which 41.0% had children under the age of 18 living with them, 64.6% were married couples living together, 8.9% had a female householder with no husband present, 6.6% had a male householder with no wife present, and 20.0% were non-families. 12.8% of all households were made up of individuals, and 3.6% had someone living alone who was 65 years of age or older. The average household size was 2.96 and the average family size was 3.24.

The median age in the city was 32.5 years. 29.8% of residents were under the age of 18; 8.5% were between the ages of 18 and 24; 29.8% were from 25 to 44; 23.6% were from 45 to 64; and 8.4% were 65 years of age or older. The gender makeup of the city was 49.8% male and 50.2% female.

=== 2000 census ===
As of the census of 2000, there were 724 people, 252 households, and 199 families living in the city. The population density was 1,352.9 inhabitants per square mile (522.4/km^{2}). There were 267 housing units at an average density of 498.9 per square mile (192.6/km^{2}). The racial makeup of the city was 91.30% White, 0.14% African American, 1.10% Native American, 0.14% Asian, 4.83% from other races, and 2.49% from two or more races. Hispanic or Latino of any race were 5.52% of the population.

There were 252 households, out of which 38.5% had children under the age of 18 living with them, 65.5% were married couples living together, 8.3% had a female householder with no husband present, and 21.0% were non-families. 15.5% of all households were made up of individuals, and 4.8% had someone living alone who was 65 years of age or older. The average household size was 2.87 and the average family size was 3.18.

In the city, the population was spread out, with 27.9% under the age of 18, 11.7% from 18 to 24, 30.1% from 25 to 44, 22.4% from 45 to 64, and 7.9% who were 65 years of age or older. The median age was 32 years. For every 100 females, there were 115.5 males. For every 100 females age 18 and over, there were 116.6 males.

The median income for a household in the city was $45,909, and the median income for a family was $46,477. Males had a median income of $32,202 versus $18,750 for females. The per capita income for the city was $16,933. About 2.6% of families and 4.6% of the population were below the poverty line, including 3.5% of those under age 18 and none of those age 65 or over.
