= .50 Action Express =

Pistol cartridge designed by Evan Whildin

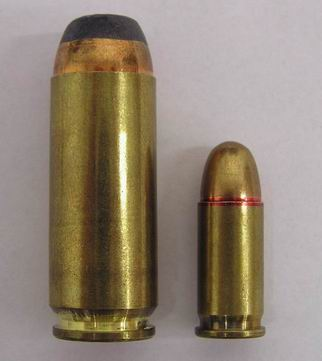
- .50 Action Express (left) round next to a .32 ACP cartridge (right)
- Type: Handgun
- Place of origin: United States

Production history
- Designer: Evan Whildin, Action Arms
- Designed: 1988
- Produced: 1988–present

Specifications
- Case type: Rebated, straight
- Bullet diameter: .500 in (12.7 mm)
- Land diameter: .494 in (12.5 mm)
- Neck diameter: .531 in (13.5 mm)
- Base diameter: .543 in (13.8 mm)
- Rim diameter: .514 in (13.1 mm)
- Rim thickness: .060 in (1.5 mm)
- Case length: 1.285 in (32.6 mm)
- Overall length: 1.610 in (40.9 mm)
- Rifling twist: 1:19 in
- Primer type: Large pistol
- Maximum pressure: 36,000 psi (250 MPa)

Ballistic performance
Bullet mass/type	Velocity	Energy
300 gr (19 g) XTP Hornady	1,475 ft/s (450 m/s)	1,449 ft⋅lbf (1,965 J)
300 gr (19 g) GDHP Speer	1,550 ft/s (470 m/s)	1,600 ft⋅lbf (2,200 J)
325 gr (21 g) UCHP Speer	1,450 ft/s (440 m/s)	1,517 ft⋅lbf (2,057 J)
400 gr (26 g) TII WFNGC	1,200 ft/s (370 m/s)	1,279 ft⋅lbf (1,734 J)
460 gr (30 g) TII WFNGC subsonic	1,050 ft/s (320 m/s)	1,126 ft⋅lbf (1,527 J)
- Test barrel length: 6 in (152 mm); Sources: TII Armory; Accurate Powder; Speer

The .50 Action Express (AE) (12.7×33mmRB) is a large-caliber handgun cartridge, best known for its usage in the Desert Eagle. Developed in 1988 by American Evan Whildin of Action Arms, the .50 AE is one of the most powerful pistol cartridges in production.

== Overview ==
The actual cartridge has a .543-inch diameter (13.8 mm) base, with a rebated rim. The rim diameter of the .50 AE is the same as the .44 Remington Magnum cartridge. A Mark XIX Desert Eagle in .50 AE can be converted to .44 with nothing more than a barrel and magazine change.

The introduction of the .50 AE in the United States was met with a rocky start. Federal firearms statutes state that non-sporting firearms may not be over 0.500 inches in bore diameter (measured land to land) to meet Title I regulations. The original .50 AE bore diameter was .500 in, with conventional rifling, but the switch to polygonal rifling on production Desert Eagles allowed the gauge plug to drop through, rendering the gun a destructive device under Bureau of Alcohol, Tobacco, Firearms and Explosives (BATFE) regulations. Actual bullet diameter was reduced to the current 0.500 inches (12.7 mm) rather than the original 0.510 inches (13.0 mm) – thus the noticeably tapered case.

Recoil of the .50 AE in the Desert Eagle pistol is substantial, although only marginally more severe than the .44 Magnum, as the automatic mechanism and weight of the gun smooth the recoil somewhat. Other firearms chambered for the .50 AE include the AMT AutoMag V, the LAR Grizzly Win Mag, the Magnum Research BFR, the Freedoms Arms Model 555, and the Bond Arms Cyclops.

== Performance ==
SAAMI specifies a maximum chamber pressure of 36,000 pounds per square inch (250 MPa) for the .50 AE. Available factory loads can produce nearly 1,800 ft⋅lbf (2,400 J) of muzzle energy.

== Use ==
Like other handgun cartridges of such magnitude, the principal uses of the .50 AE are metallic silhouette shooting and medium/big game hunting. Like the .44 Magnum, .454 Casull, .460 S&W Magnum, and .500 S&W Magnum, it is also well suited for defense against large predators, such as bears. With heavier bullets, such as the TII Armory 400-grain and 460-grain offerings, the .50 AE closely matches the performance of the .480 Ruger and approaches the ballistics of the .500 Linebaugh.

== The .50 AE as a parent case ==
The .50 AE is the parent case for the .440 Cor-Bon (1998) by Cor-Bon and the .429 DE (2018) by Magnum Research (a division of Kahr Firearms Group). Though similar, they are not interchangeable. Desert Eagle magazines for .50 AE cartridges can feed the derivative cartridges, but should be paired with barrels appropriate for their cartridge and caliber.

== Images ==
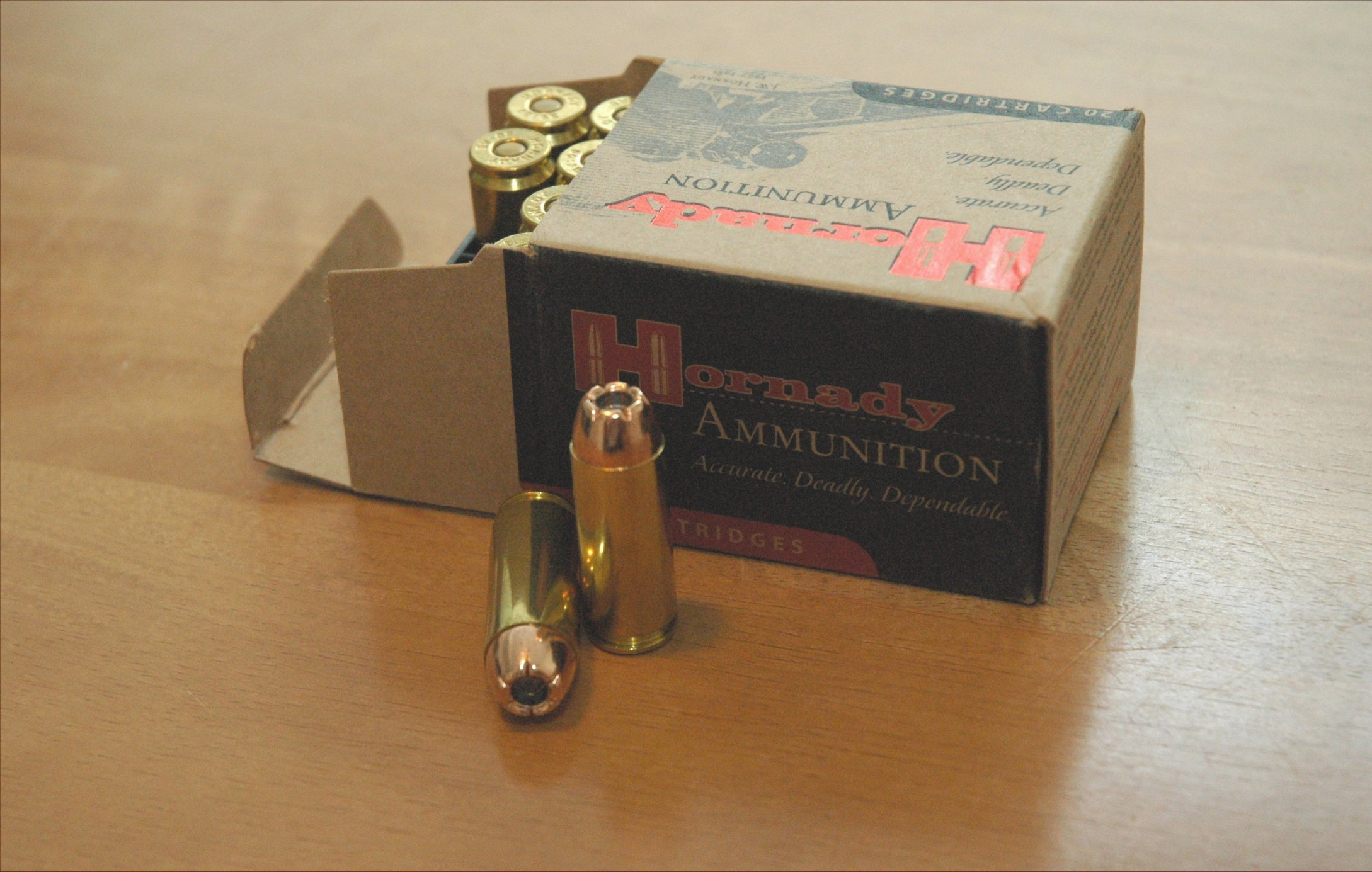
Box of Hornady .50 AE 300-grain jacketed hollow point ammunition

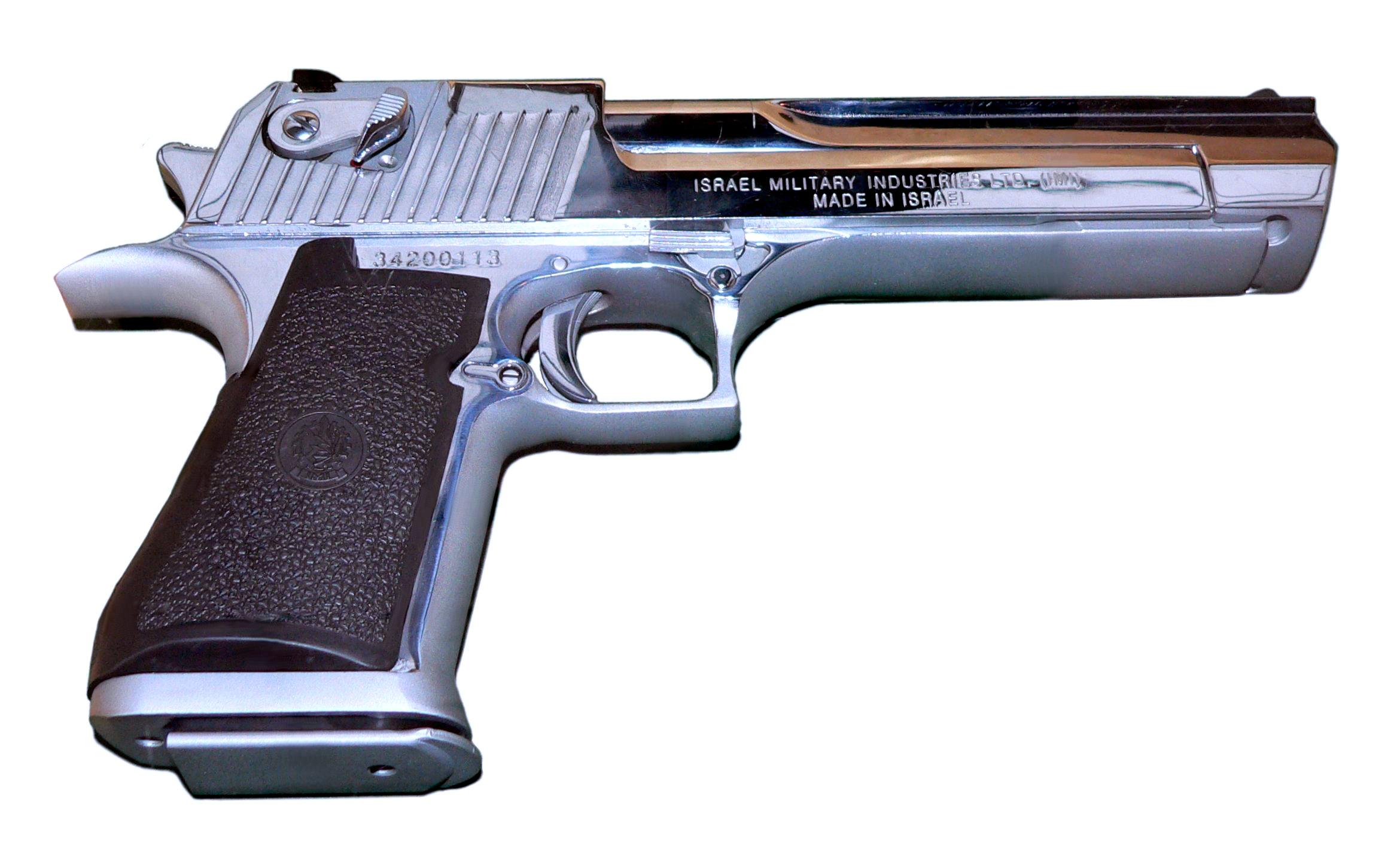
Desert Eagle Mark XIX (Mark 19) in .50 AE

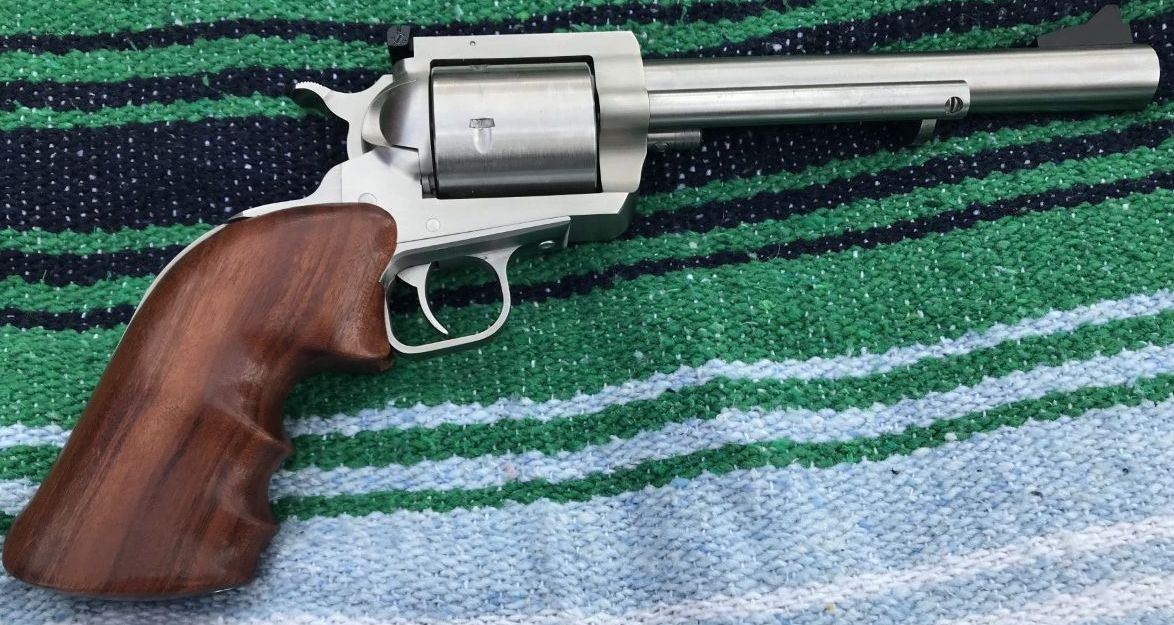
Magnum Research BFR in .50 AE

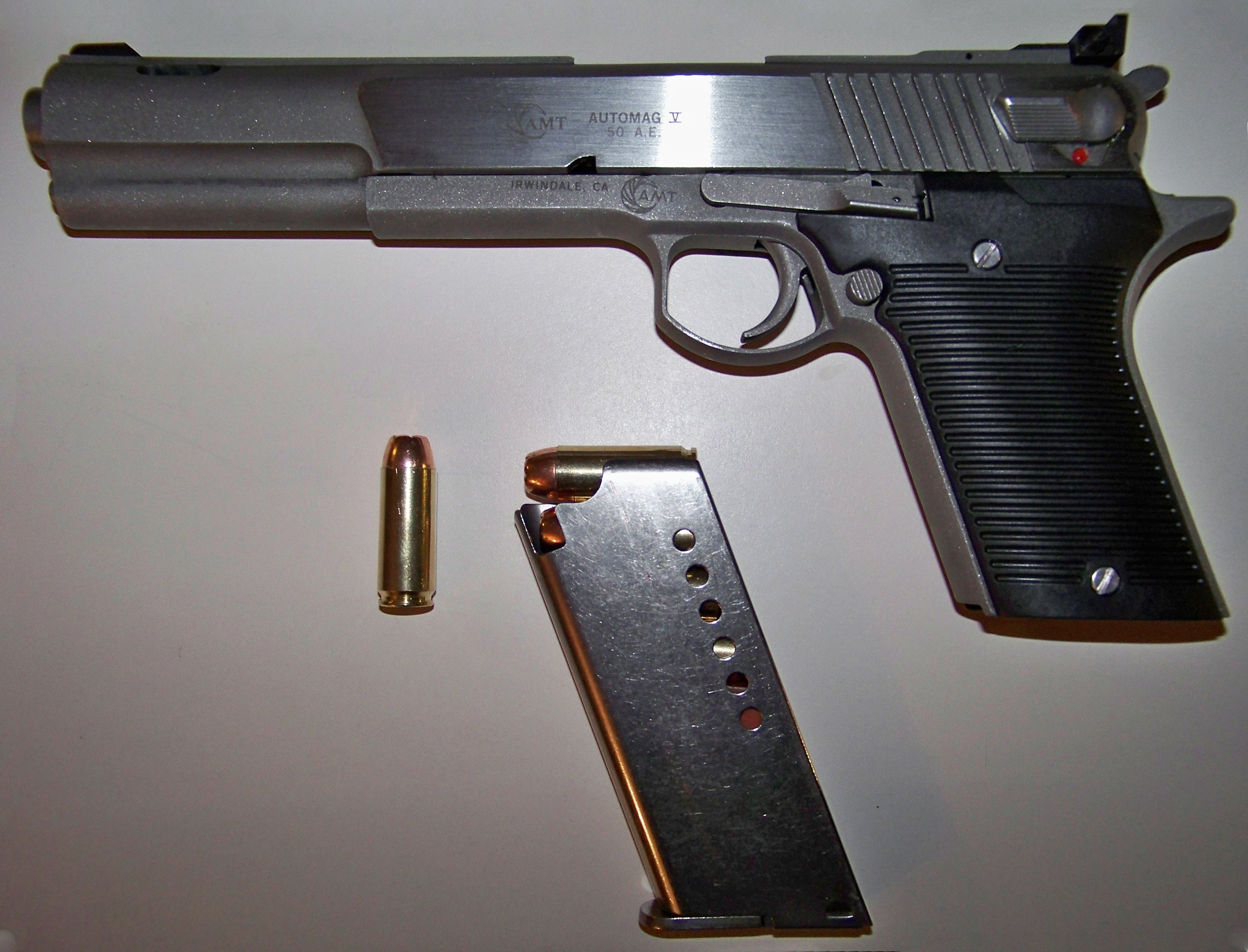
AMT AutoMag V in .50 AE

== See also ==
- Table of handgun and rifle cartridges
