= Ruger Super Redhawk =

Super Redhawk
- Type: Revolver
- Place of origin: United States

Production history
- Designer: Robert, Nixon
- Designed: 1987
- Manufacturer: Sturm, Ruger
- Produced: 1987–present

Specifications
- Mass: 1502 g / 53 oz / 3.3125 lbs (unloaded)
- Length: 194 mm / 7.62 in (2.5" barreled Alaskan) 330 mm / 13 in (7.5" barrel) or 381 mm / 15 in (9.5" barrel)
- Caliber: 22 Hornet, 10mm Auto, .357 Magnum, .44 Magnum, .454 Casull, and .480 Ruger
- Action: Double action
- Feed system: 5 or 6 shot cylinder
- Sights: Fixed front and adjustable rear, with scope rail

The Super Redhawk is a line of double-action magnum revolvers made by Sturm, Ruger beginning in 1987, when Ruger started making weapons using larger, more powerful cartridges such as .44 Magnum, .454 Casull, and .480 Ruger.

== Introduction ==
The Super Redhawk was introduced late in 1987, in .44 Magnum with 7.5- and 9.5-inch barrel lengths. The final product used the same trigger design and same grip panels as the .357 Magnum GP100, but had a larger, stronger frame with integrated scope bases. The Super Redhawk received positive reviews, edging out similar offerings from Smith & Wesson in accuracy and price.

The Super Redhawk is only available in stainless steel with a number of finishes. The standard finish is brushed steel, with a semi-gloss look. Polished, high-gloss versions have also been offered in the past. Stainless steel one-inch scope rings are included, using the standard Ruger lockup common to all Ruger integral bases. These rings easily allow removing the scope from the handgun, without significantly altering zero or eye-relief, once the scope is re-installed. The Super Redhawk uses different front and rear rings, with the rear ring being shorter than the front ring due to differences in frame height.

Despite plans to drop the Ruger Redhawk revolver with the introduction of the Super Redhawk, the original Redhawk remains in production as of 2026. Many shooters prefer the more classic lines of the Redhawk, especially those who do not plan to use a scope. The Redhawk is also available with different barrel lengths, 4, 5.5 and 7.5 inches.

Versions of the Super Redhawk with 20-inch barrels were produced for the UK market with serial numbers in the 551-5xxxx and 551-7xxxx range. Model numbers were KSRH-21-357 (.357 Magnum) and KSRH-21 (.44 Magnum). 200 were made in total evenly split between .357 and .44 for the importers. The vast majority had their length cut down for competition shooting and only a small handful remain in the original long barrelled version.

=== .454 Casull ===
Introduced in 1997, the Super Redhawk chambered in .454 Casull was the first six-shot revolver in that caliber. The Freedom Arms cylinder and numerous conversions only hold 5 rounds. To handle the extreme pressures of the .454 Casull without changing the design of the cylinder, Ruger used a different alloy and heat treatment process to increase its strength, omitting the cylinder flutes found on the Ruger Redhawk. The frame is identical to the standard Super Redhawk, but features a target grey finish produced by tumbling the parts in special polishing media.

The .454 Casull model is actually marked as ".454 Casull /.45 Colt", and is also capable of shooting the shorter .45 Colt cartridge. While the .45 Colt is less powerful than the .454 Casull, it costs less to shoot and has much less muzzle blast and recoil, while offering improved barrel life.

=== .480 Ruger ===
The year 2001 saw the release of Ruger's first cartridge, the .480 Ruger, developed for the Super Redhawk. The .480 Ruger is built on the same frame as the .454 Casull, and was introduced as a six-shot model. While the .480 Ruger is not loaded to the rifle-like pressures of the .454 Casull, the bigger (.475 caliber, 12 mm) bore allows the use of heavier bullets than the .454 Casull, making it a good choice for handgun hunting. The .480 Ruger operates at far lower pressures than the .454 Casull, making it more comfortable to shoot.

The standard Hornady 325 gr JHP .480 Ruger cartridge can produce a muzzle velocity of 1350 ft/s (405 m/s) and generates one-third more muzzle energy than the standard .44 Magnum cartridge, with substantially less recoil than other big-bore hunting handgun cartridges. The large, heavy bullet still offers excellent penetration for big game hunting.

Although muzzle energy is below the .454 Casull (energy figures are not the only, or the best method of comparing bullet effectiveness, as caliber and bullet construction are not taken into consideration), the .480 Ruger's larger caliber, and heavier bullet selection, offers Taylor Knock-out values (TKO) equal to, or better than, traditional .454 loads. The cartridge accomplishes this with less recoil, concussion, and muzzle blast, due to its lower operating pressures.

==== Model redesign ====
In 2007, Ruger temporarily ceased production of the .480 Ruger models due to fired case extraction issues and popular demand. The fired case extraction issues resulted from individuals loading cartridges to pressures that were not meant to be for the 480 Ruger cartridge. After analyzing the problem, Ruger decided to start fitting the .480 Ruger models with 5-shot, rather than the original 6-shot, cylinders. With this release, Ruger also changed to Hogue Monogrip grips. After a couple years off of the line-up, Ruger re-introduced the .480 Ruger model, again with the original 6-shot configuration, in January 2013. Like the current .454 Casull and .44 Magnum versions, it now sports a "conventional" satin stainless-steel finish, along with the Hogue Monogrips.

=== 10mm Auto ===
In 2018, Ruger released a version of the Super Redhawk chambered in 10mm Auto.This variant features a 6.5-inch (170 mm) barrel and uses full moon clips to eject rounds from the cylinder. Rounds may be inserted and fired without the clips, but will require manual ejection with some type of rod.

=== Super Redhawk Alaskan ===
Ruger Redhawk: Alaskan
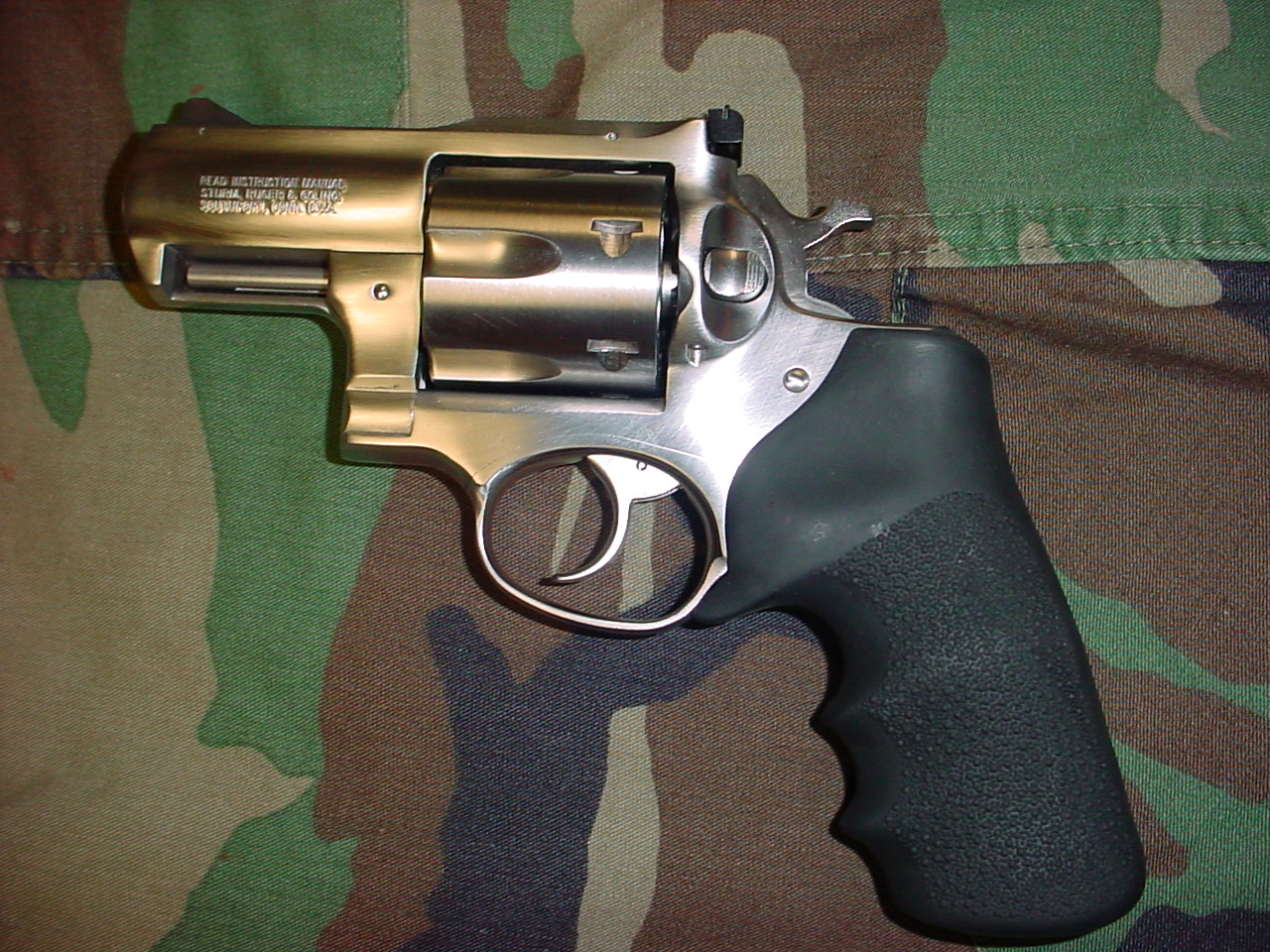
- Type: Revolver
- Place of origin: United States

Production history
- Manufacturer: Sturm, Ruger & Company

Specifications
- Mass: 2.75 lb (1.25 kg)
- Length: 7.6 in (190 mm)
- Barrel length: 2.5 in (64 mm)
- Caliber: .480 Ruger, .44 Magnum, .454 Casull
- Action: Double-action revolver
- Feed system: Six-round cylinder, five-shot cylinder on 2008 and later .480 Ruger

Introduced in 2005, the Ruger Alaskan is Ruger's first short-barrelled, big-bore revolver, conceived by Ruger president Steve Sanetti and intended for defense against large, dangerous animals. The 2.5-inch (64 mm) barrel on the Alaskan ends at the edge of the frame, and the scope bases are omitted. The interchangeable front sight is replaced with a pinned-in ramp sight, but the adjustable rear sight is retained. The Alaskan is available in .44 Magnum, .454 Casull/.45 Colt, and .480 Ruger; with the .480 model originally with a six-shot cylinder, but replaced in 2008 with a five-shot model to aid in spent cartridge extraction. All Alaskans feature a brushed stainless finish and a Hogue Tamer rubber finger groove grip, rather than the standard GP100 style grips. The .454 and .480 versions have an unfluted cylinder while the .44 Magnum features a fluted cylinder.

The advantage of such a short barrel is that it can be quickly drawn from a chest holster which is typically out of the way while performing outdoor activities such as fly fishing, hiking, etc. However, the primary trade off for using such a short barrel with a high power cartridge is the loss of projectile kinetic energy out of the muzzle. The factory loaded .454 Casull Hornady XTP is rated by the manufacturer at 1650 feet per second out of a 7.5-inch (190 mm) barrel. The Ruger Super Redhawk Alaskan sacrifices 300 feet per second with its 2.5-inch (64 mm) barrel.

In August 2009, Greg Brush from Soldotna, Alaska, was walking his dog when an Alaskan brown bear charged him. Drawing his .454 Casull Ruger Alaskan while rapidly backpedaling, he fired three shots in quick succession into the bear; followed by a fourth and final shot. The fifth round failed to discharge due to an ammunition failure interfering with the cylinder rotation. The animal was stopped 10 feet (3.0 m) beyond Brush's original starting position.
