= Magnum Research =

American firearms manufacturer

Magnum Research, Inc.
- Type: Subsidiary
- Founded: 1979; 47 years ago
- Fate: 2010; 16 years ago buyout by Kahr Arms
- Headquarters: Pike County, Pennsylvania, United States
- Products: Firearms
- Parent: Kahr Arms
- Website: MagnumResearch.com

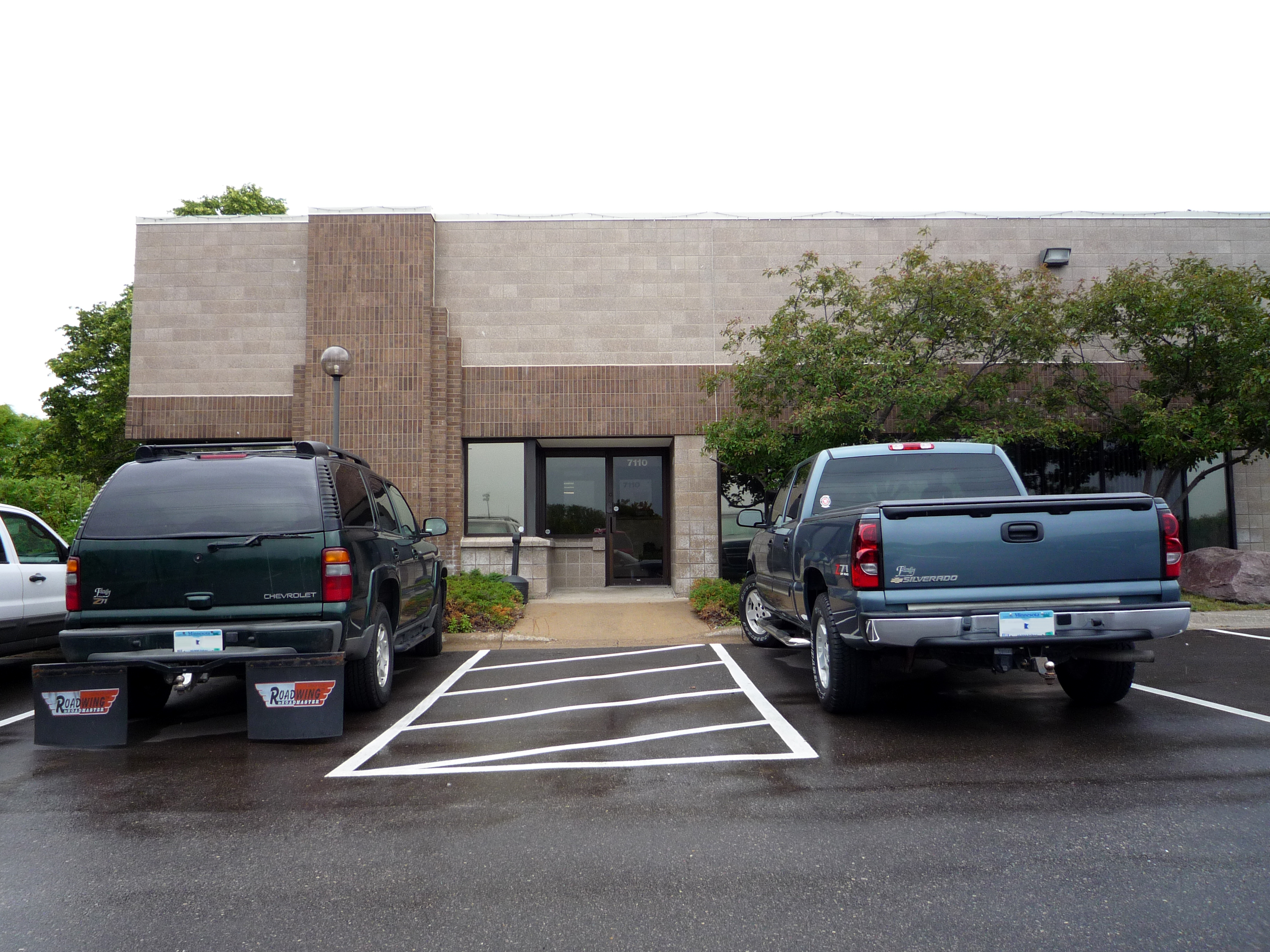
The unmarked Magnum Research headquarters in Fridley

Magnum Research, Inc. (MRI) was an American privately held corporation based in Fridley, Minnesota which manufactured and distributed firearms. The majority owners, Jim Skildum (President and CEO) and John Risdall (Chairman, COO), had been with the company since its founding in 1979.

In June 2010, Magnum Research, in financial difficulties, was sold to Kahr Arms, an American-based producer of compact pistols.

== Products ==
=== Desert Eagle Pistol ===
MRI was responsible for the design and development of the Desert Eagle pistol. The design was refined and for some time the pistols were also manufactured by Israel Military Industries (IMI) until 1995, when MRI shifted the manufacturing contract and license to Saco Defense in Saco, Maine. In 1998 MRI shifted manufacturing back to IMI, which later reorganized under the name Israel Weapon Industries. Since 2009 the Desert Eagle Pistol has been exclusively produced in the USA only, at MRI’s Pillager, Minnesota facility. Both Saco and IMI/IWI were strictly manufacturing contractors: all of the intellectual property, including patents, copyrights and trademarks of the Desert Eagle since its creation have been the property of Magnum Research Incorporated, excluding the patent on the production model which was owned by IMI.

=== Jericho 941 Pistol / Baby Eagle ===
Magnum Research imported the IMI/IWI Jericho 941 series of pistols under the Baby Eagle name until the end of 2008 and resumed importation of this model in 2011 under the name Baby Eagle II. Currently, the Baby Eagle name is used on a new series of striker-fired polymer-framed pistols. For a time they also imported the Barak SP-21 pistol, but it is no longer offered.

=== Single-Action Magnum Revolvers ===
Other products include the BFR series of single-action magnum revolvers, the Mountain Eagle rifle, Magnum Lite rifle, and Micro Desert Eagle.

=== Custom Service ===
MRI offered custom gunsmithing services and had a line of guns that were coated with titanium nitride in artful patterns and designs.

=== Current models ===
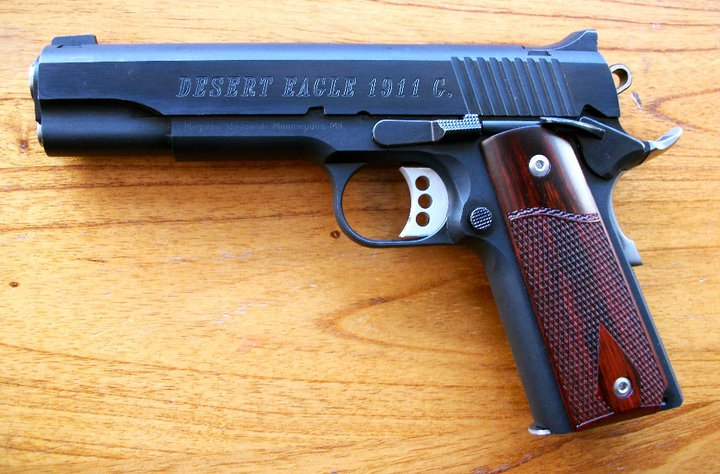
Magnum Research Desert Eagle 1911G

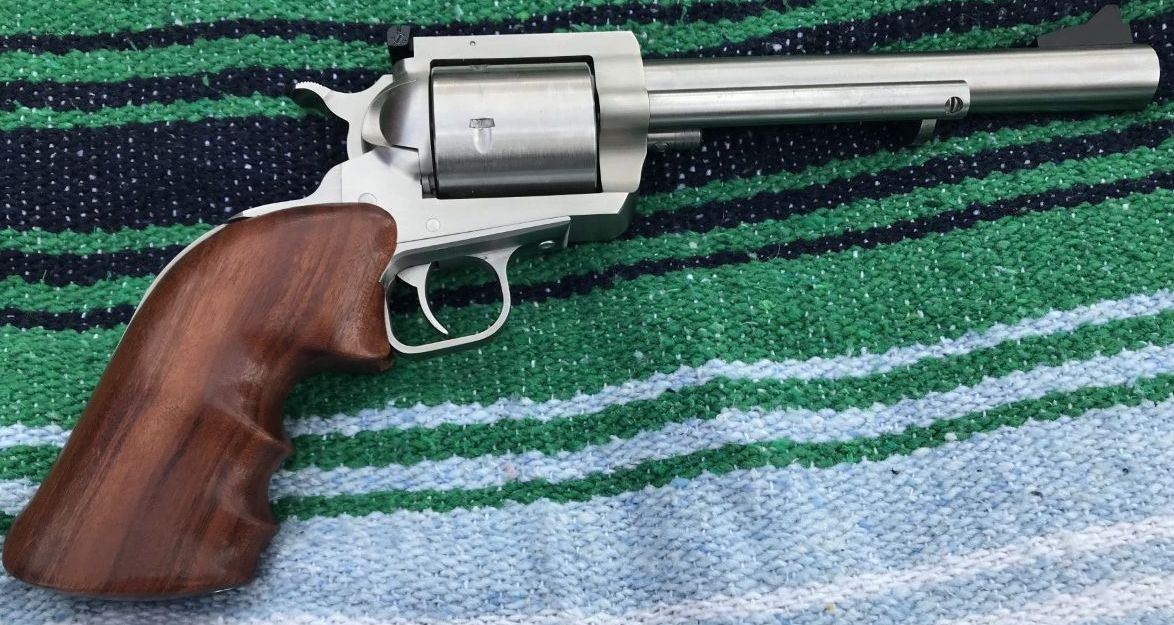
Magnum Research BFR in .50 AE

- Magnum Research DE1911G, DE1911C, and DE1911U
- Desert Eagle (Mark VII pistol, Mark XIX pistol)
- Magnum Lite (rimfire rifle)
- Magnum Research BFR (Big Frame Revolver)
- Micro Desert Eagle (.380 ACP)
- MR Eagle Series Pistols
- Mountain Eagle (center-fire rifle)
- New Baby Eagle "Fast Action"
- Desert Eagle 1911 (.45 ACP)
- Baby Eagle II
- Baby Eagle III

=== Discontinued models ===
- Original Baby Eagle (9mm, .40 S&W, or .45 ACP)
- Lone Eagle (single-shot, center-fire pistol for rifle cartridges)
- Magnum Research SP-21
- Mountain Eagle pistol (.22 LR)
- MR9/MR40 Eagle (Walther P99 versions, with the frame supplied by Walther)
