= .500 Linebaugh =

Revolver cartridge

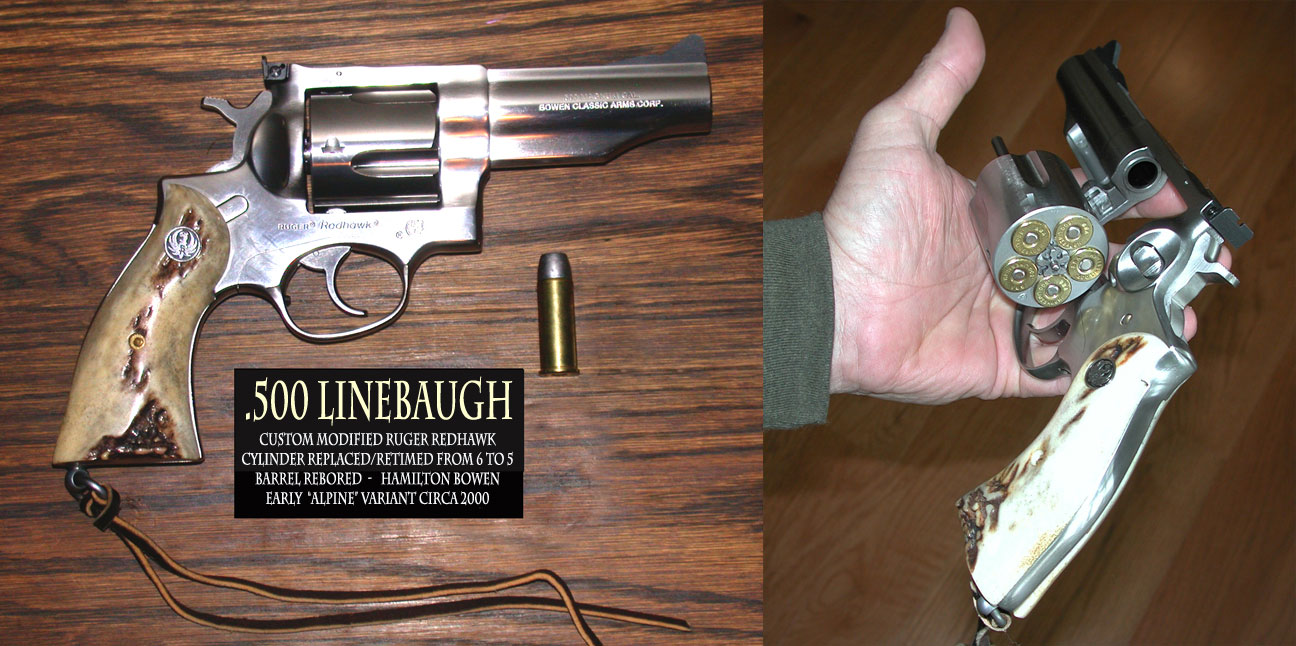
- Type: Handgun cartridge
- Place of origin: United States

Production history
- Designer: John Linebaugh
- Designed: 1986
- Variants: .500 Linebaugh Long or .500 Linebaugh Maximum

Specifications
- Parent case: .348 Winchester
- Case type: Rimmed, straight
- Bullet diameter: .510 in (13.0 mm)
- Neck diameter: .540 in (13.7 mm)
- Base diameter: .553 in (14.0 mm)
- Rim diameter: .610 in (15.5 mm)
- Rim thickness: .065 in (1.7 mm)
- Case length: 1.405 in (35.7 mm)
- Overall length: 1.755 in (44.6 mm)
- Primer type: Large rifle

Ballistic performance
Bullet mass/type	Velocity	Energy
435 gr (28 g) L.B.T-L.F.N Buffalo Bore	1,300 ft/s (400 m/s)	1,632 ft⋅lbf (2,213 J)
525 gr (34 g) L.B.T-L.F.N Buffalo Bore	1,100 ft/s (340 m/s)	1,410 ft⋅lbf (1,910 J)

The .500 Linebaugh (13x35mmR) is a .50 caliber handgun cartridge designed for use in revolvers.

== History ==
Inspired by the existing .50 WT Super cartridge devised by Neil Wheeler and Bill Topping of Sandy, Utah, John Linebaugh developed the .500 Linebaugh cartridge in 1986. Linebaugh was then known for converting six-shot .45 Colt revolvers to five-shot configuration, which allowed the use of higher-pressure ammunition than would be safe in many existing firearms chambered for the cartridge. While this venture was a success, Linebaugh was intrigued by Wheeler and Topping's work, and decided to pursue a .50 caliber handgun cartridge of his own.

The cartridge case itself was designed by cutting off the .348 Winchester case to 1.405 in (35.7 mm), opening the case mouth to accept a .510 caliber (12.95 mm) bullet, and reaming the inside of the case. The first revolvers converted to use the .500 Linebaugh were the Ruger Bisley and the Seville revolvers. Due to the demise of the Seville revolvers in the early 1990s, most subsequent conversions have been carried out on revolvers based on the Ruger Bisley frame.

It was when the supply of .348 Winchester cases started running out that John Linebaugh began working on the .475 Linebaugh, which could be formed from the more available .45-70 Government cases. When the Winchester Model 71 was reintroduced in the .348 Winchester, the ability to form .500 Linebaugh cases again became feasible. Today, Starline and Buffalo Bore offer .500 Linebaugh cases which are not dependent on the supply of .348 Winchester cases.

== Cartridge design and specifications ==
The .500 Linebaugh is a proprietary cartridge and thus has not been adopted by mainline firearms manufacturers. Currently the only firearm manufacturer that produces a revolver for this cartridge is Magnum Research (owned by Kahr Firearms Group), in the BFR product line. Prior to January 2019, the only alternative was to have a gunsmith such as John Linebaugh of Linebaugh Custom Six guns or Hamilton Bowen of Bowen Classic Arms convert pre-existing revolvers such as the Ruger Blackhawk and Bisley to fire the cartridge. Bowen is known to have converted the Ruger Redhawk double-action revolver for use with this cartridge.

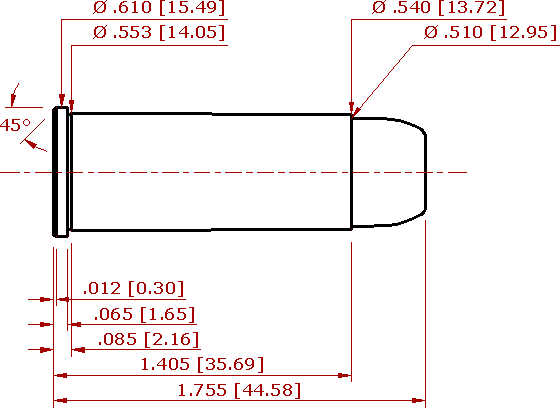

Due to the proprietary status of the cartridge neither the CIP nor SAAMI have published official specifications for the cartridge. As is the case, there can be some variations from gunsmith to gunsmith. No pressure standard has been published for the cartridge but according to Linebaugh, pressure levels between 30,000 psi (210 MPa) and 35,000 psi (240 MPa) are considered safe in the converted revolvers.

The cartridge uses .510 in (12.95 mm) diameter jacketed bullets or .511-.512 in (12.98-13.01 mm) lead bullets.

== Sporting usage ==
The .500 Linebaugh was designed as a hunting cartridge. It was designed to fire a 440 gr (29 g) bullet at 1,300 ft/s (400 m/s). This particular loading generates 1,650 ft⋅lbf (2,240 J) of energy making this one of the most powerful handgun cartridges put into production. In terms of energy, this is comparable to the .454 Casull cartridge. However, the .500 Linebaugh provides a larger diameter, heavier bullet with a greater sectional density than the .454 Casull. As a hunting cartridge it is capable of taking any North American game animals and most African game species.

== See also ==
- .50 Action Express
- .50 GI
- .500 S&W Magnum
- List of rimmed cartridges
- 13 mm caliber
- List of handgun cartridges
