= .500 S&W Magnum =

Revolver cartridge designed by Cor-bon and Smith & Wesson (S&W)

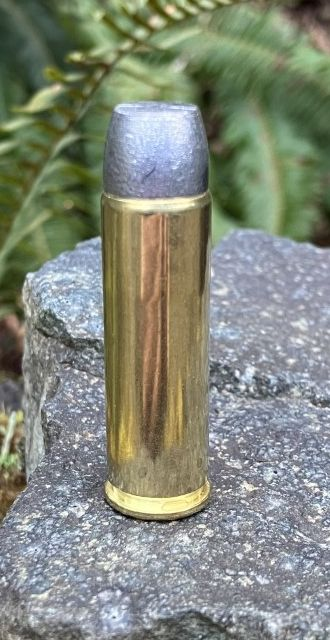
- .500 S&W Magnum Cartridge
- Type: Revolver, Pistol, and Rifle
- Place of origin: United States

Production history
- Designer: Cor-Bon; Smith & Wesson
- Designed: 2003
- Manufacturer: Smith & Wesson
- Produced: 2003–present

Specifications
- Case type: Semi-rimmed, straight
- Bullet diameter: .500 in (12.7 mm)
- Neck diameter: .526 in (13.4 mm)
- Base diameter: .526 in (13.4 mm)
- Rim diameter: .556 in (14.1 mm)
- Rim thickness: .056 in (1.4 mm)
- Case length: 1.625 in (41.3 mm)
- Overall length: 2.3 in (58 mm)
- Primer type: Large rifle (formerly large pistol)
- Maximum pressure: 60,000 psi (410 MPa)

Ballistic performance
Bullet mass/type	Velocity	Energy
300 gr (19 g) FTX Hornady	2,075 ft/s (632 m/s)	2,868 ft⋅lbf (3,888 J)
350 gr (23 g) XTP HP Underwood	1,912 ft/s (583 m/s)	2,842 ft⋅lbf (3,853 J)
700 gr (45 g) WFN Underwood	1,200 ft/s (370 m/s)	2,238 ft⋅lbf (3,034 J)
- Test barrel length: 8.375 in Sources: Hornady, Underwood

The .500 S&W Magnum or 12.7×41mmSR is a .50 caliber semi-rimmed revolver cartridge developed by Cor-Bon in partnership with the Smith & Wesson "X-Gun" engineering team for use in the Smith & Wesson Model 500 X-frame revolver and introduced in February 2003 at the SHOT Show. It was intended to be the most powerful handgun cartridge to date, with the capacity to harvest all North American game species. It achieved that distinction and remained the most powerful handgun cartridge decades later.

== Cartridge history ==
Smith & Wesson had been at the forefront of the development of powerful handgun cartridges such as the .357 S&W Magnum and the .44 Remington Magnum. However, in 1960, the company's .44 Magnum, which it had developed in partnership with Remington, was eclipsed by the .454 Casull.

In 1971, Smith & Wesson experienced a dramatic surge in orders for their Model 29 revolver in the .44 Magnum chambering. As S&W production was not able to keep up with demand, available Model 29 revolvers were being sold for two to three times the suggested retail price. This surge in interest was largely due to the 1971 film Dirty Harry, where the Model 29 revolver was billed as the most powerful revolver (The .454 Casull, designed in 1955, was not in commercial production until 1997). With the introduction of the .500 S&W Magnum and the Model 500 revolver, Smith & Wesson recaptured the title of "most powerful handgun", which once again proved beneficial for the company's sales.

The .500 Smith & Wesson Magnum was designed from the outset to be the most powerful production handgun cartridge. S&W product manager, Herb Belin, proposed the idea of developing the revolver and cartridge to the S&W sales team. With the backing of the sales team, the project was approved by S&W president Bob Scott. The ammunition was developed by Cor-Bon and Peter Pi in partnership with the S&W X-Gun engineering team of Brett Curry, Rich Mikuta, and Tom Oakley. Eleven months later, on 9 January 2003, the team unveiled the Smith & Wesson Model 500 revolver and the .500 S&W Magnum cartridge. According to Belin, the cartridge was designed from its inception to be substantially more powerful than any other prior production handgun cartridge. Cor-Bon later developed the .500 S&W Special cartridge to offer a more moderate level of power from firearms chambered in the .500 S&W.

== Cartridge design and specifications ==
The .500 S&W Magnum is a semi-rimmed, cylindrical cartridge optimized for use in revolvers. The cartridge is designed to headspace on its rim. However, unlike the .44 Magnum and other rimmed cartridges designed for use in revolvers, the .500 S&W cartridge is semi-rimmed, and can accordingly be cycled more smoothly and more reliably in tubular magazines. However, the cartridge does not cycle well through box magazines. The rim tends to lock in the extractor groove.

The .500 S&W Magnum was designed to fire a bullet with a diameter (⌀) of 0.500 in (12.7 mm) unlike the .500 Linebaugh, which fires a 0.510 in (12.9 mm) bullet. This was done so as not to run afoul of the National Firearms Act and be considered a destructive device as had happened to Whildin's .50 AE cartridge, which at first was designed to fire a 0.510 in (12.9 mm) but had to be redesigned to fire a 0.500 in (12.7 mm) instead.

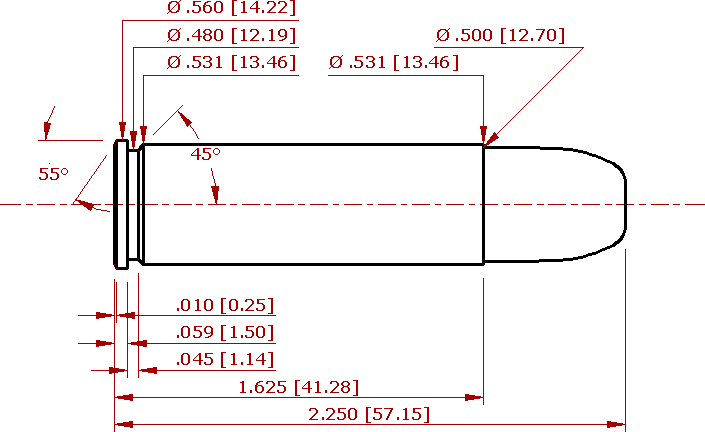
SAAMI-compliant .500 S&W Magnum cartridge schematic: All dimensions in inches (millimeters).

The .500 S&W Magnum has a maximum working pressure of 60,000 psi (4,100 bar). However, most factory ammunition is limited to 50,000 psi (3,400 bar) to help ease extraction of fired cases. The cylinders of the S&W Model 500 revolver are engineered to be capable of withstanding 50% over pressure. Regular proof-load testing is performed at 20% over pressure.

The cylinder bore diameter is given as .500 in (12.7 mm). SAAMI recommends a 6 groove barrel with each groove being 0.130 in (3.3 mm) wide. A barrel with a bore diameter of 0.4880 in (12.40 mm) and a groove diameter of 0.4983 in (12.66 mm) is also recommended. The recommended twist rate is 1 in 18.75 in (476 mm). While the bore diameter of 0.4880 in (12.40 mm) is consistent with other firearms which fire a 0.500 in (12.7 mm) diameter bullet, the groove diameter of 0.4983 in (12.66 mm) is an oddity as most firearms which fire a 0.500 in (12.7 mm) will have a groove diameter of equal to the diameter of the bullet.

While the overall length is given as 2.300 in (58.4 mm) by many sources, some revolvers will not be able to accept cartridges with bullets seated to this overall length. This is because the cylinders of the revolvers are too short to accommodate such cartridges. The now-discontinued Taurus Raging Bull 500 is an example of one such revolver. It has a cylinder which is about 0.200 in (5.1 mm) shorter than that of the S&W Model 500.

== Performance ==
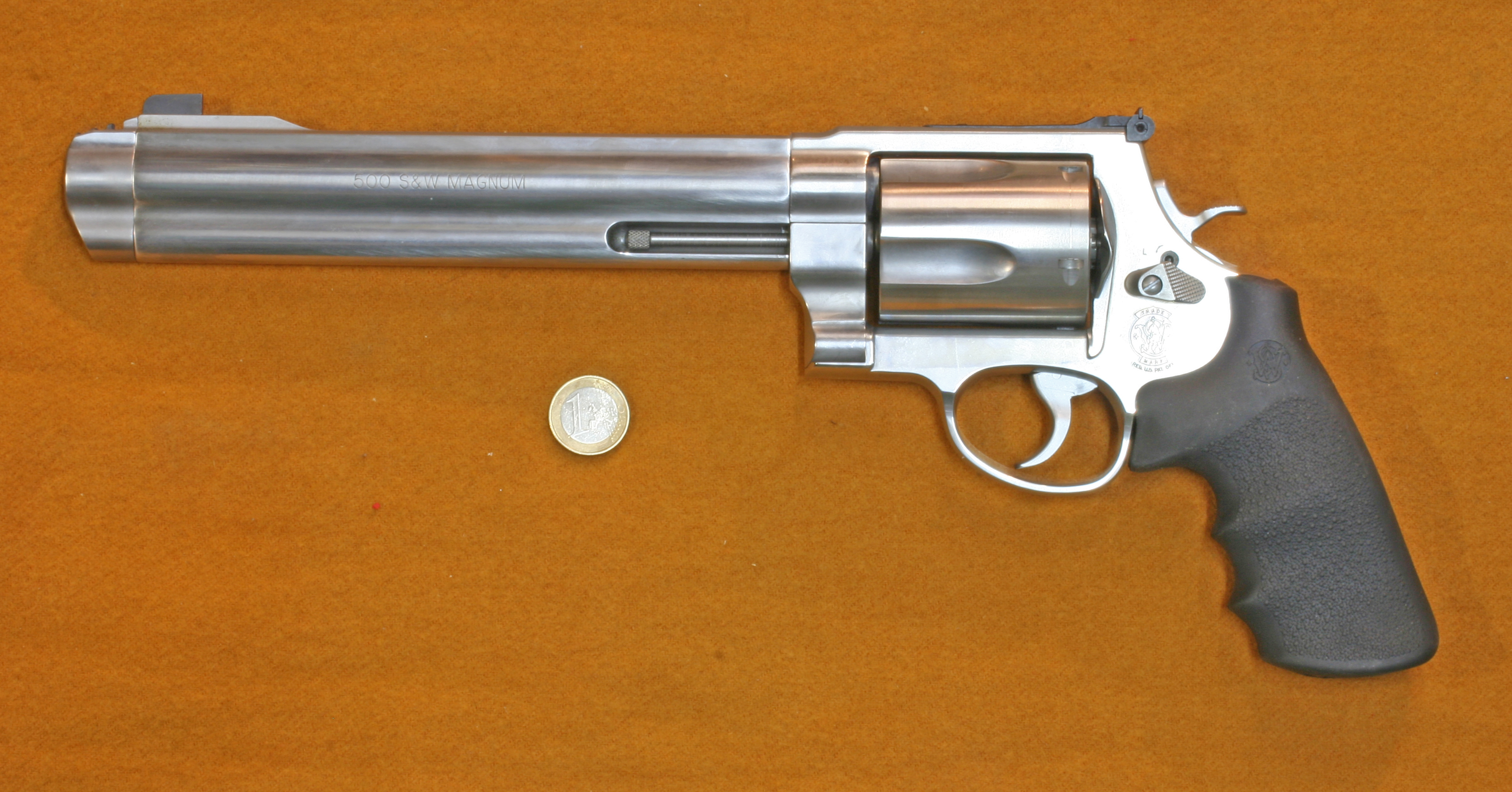
The first revolver that could accommodate the .500 Magnum cartridge was the Smith & Wesson Model 500. A one-euro coin, similar in size to an American quarter, is pictured for scale.

At the time of its introduction, the .500 S&W Magnum was considered the most powerful handgun chambering by virtue of its considerable muzzle energy. Incidentally, a lengthened form of the cartridge, the .500 Bushwhacker, is currently considered the most powerful handgun cartridge. Cor-Bon (now a Dakota Ammo brand) who together with Smith & Wesson developed the .500 S&W Magnum cartridge, offers several loads which include a 325 gr (21.1 g) at 1,800 ft/s (550 m/s), a 400 gr (26 g) at 1,625 ft/s (495 m/s) and a 440 gr (29 g) at 1,625 ft/s (495 m/s). These figures compare favorably to Smith & Wesson's newest contender for most powerful commercial sporting handgun cartridge, the .460 S&W Magnum, which can launch a 325 gr (21.1 g) at 1,650 ft/s (500 m/s) or a 395 gr (25.6 g) at 1,525 ft/s (465 m/s). The .500 S&W Magnum comes into its own when used with heavier bullets, particularly those with weights of 500 gr (32 g) or greater. These bullets are often seated as far out as possible to take advantage of the complete cylinder length, so as to maximize the powder capacity which the case can provide. Ammunition loaded to this cartridge length (2.25"-2.3") is capable of achieving 150 to 200 feet per second higher velocities than most standard length loadings (2"-2.1") without exceeding SAAMI specified operating pressures, albeit at the cost of increased recoil.

Several manufacturers currently produce the S&W .500 Magnum cartridge, with top-performing rounds delivering nearly 3,000 ft⋅lbf (4,100 J) of muzzle energy from a standard 8.375-inch (9.5 mm) barrel. It is claimed to be the most potent commercially available handgun cartridge on the market and provides power exceeding that of long-established wildcat cartridges such as the .375 JDJ (J. D. Jones) and pistol loadings of the .45-70 Government. Indeed, some rounds use bullets weighing almost 1 oz. (28 g ~ 440 gr.), which are propelled at about 1,500 ft/s (460 m/s) – essentially the same performance of a 12 gauge shotgun slug.

Bullet weights available for this cartridge range from a 265-grain (17.2 g) jacketed hollow point to a 740-grain (48 g) hardcast lead bullet. The heaviest bullet, produced by Tazza Bullets in Queensland, Australia, is a hardcast lead bullet weighing 740 grains, about the same as a common .50 BMG projectile. This bullet, launched at approximately 1,200 ft/s (370 m/s), produces around 2,366 ft⋅lbf (3,208 J) of muzzle energy.

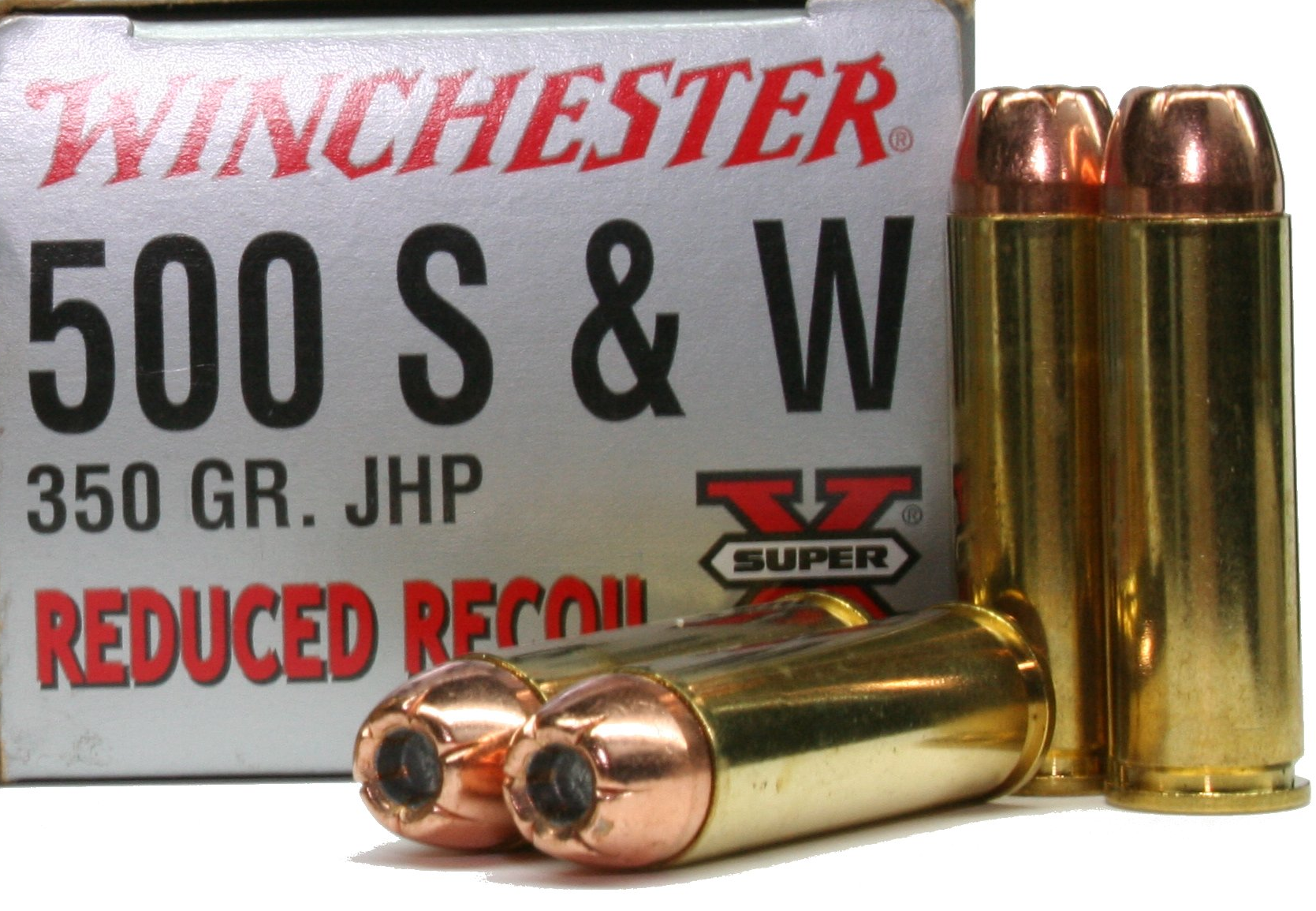
Winchester's 500 S&W Magnum 350 gr. JHP reduced recoil ammunition

Low recoil or reduced recoil ammunition is manufactured by the Grizzly Cartridge Company and Winchester. This is achieved by lowering the velocity and mass of the projectile. Winchester's reduced recoil X500SW ammunition propels a 350 gr (23 g) bullet at 1,400 ft/s (430 m/s).

Cor-Bon introduced the .500 S&W Special in 2004 as a lower energy and lower recoiling alternative to the .500 S&W Magnum cartridge. This cartridge is compatible with handguns chambered for the .500 S&W Magnum and fires a 350-grain (23 g) bullet at 1,250 feet per second (380 m/s). These low-recoiling alternatives to the full-power .500 S&W Magnum significantly reduce felt recoil, which is especially noticeable in the shorter 4-inch-barrel (100 mm) handguns. The cartridge is available from several manufacturers.

The .500 S&W Magnum has very high recoil energy and recoil velocity. The high energy and velocity of the recoil produce significant muzzle rise in revolvers so chambered. Smith & Wesson incorporated design features to help mitigate both the perceived and actual recoil of their Model 500 revolver. The revolver is equipped with a compensator and Hogue Sorbothane grips. The revolver's considerable weight of 56–82 ounces (1,600–2,300 g) plays a substantial role in moderating the recoil of the cartridge. Aftermarket offerings exist to mount a rifle-style muzzle brake to the S&W Model 500, further decreasing recoil.

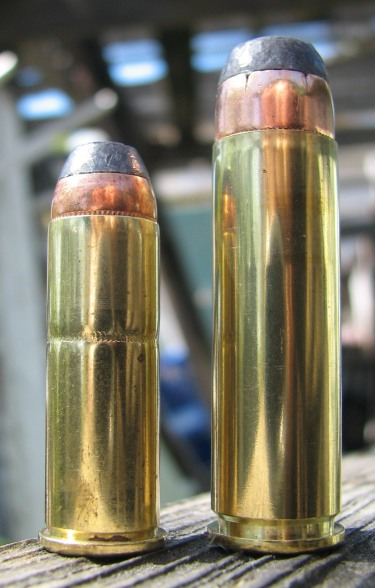
Comparison of the .44 Magnum (left) to the .500 S&W cartridge (right)

A double-discharge effect is sometimes observed with the cartridge. The heavy recoil leads some shooters to inadvertently squeeze the trigger a second time soon after the discharge of the previous round. This phenomenon is only applicable to double action revolvers, however.

== Sporting applications ==
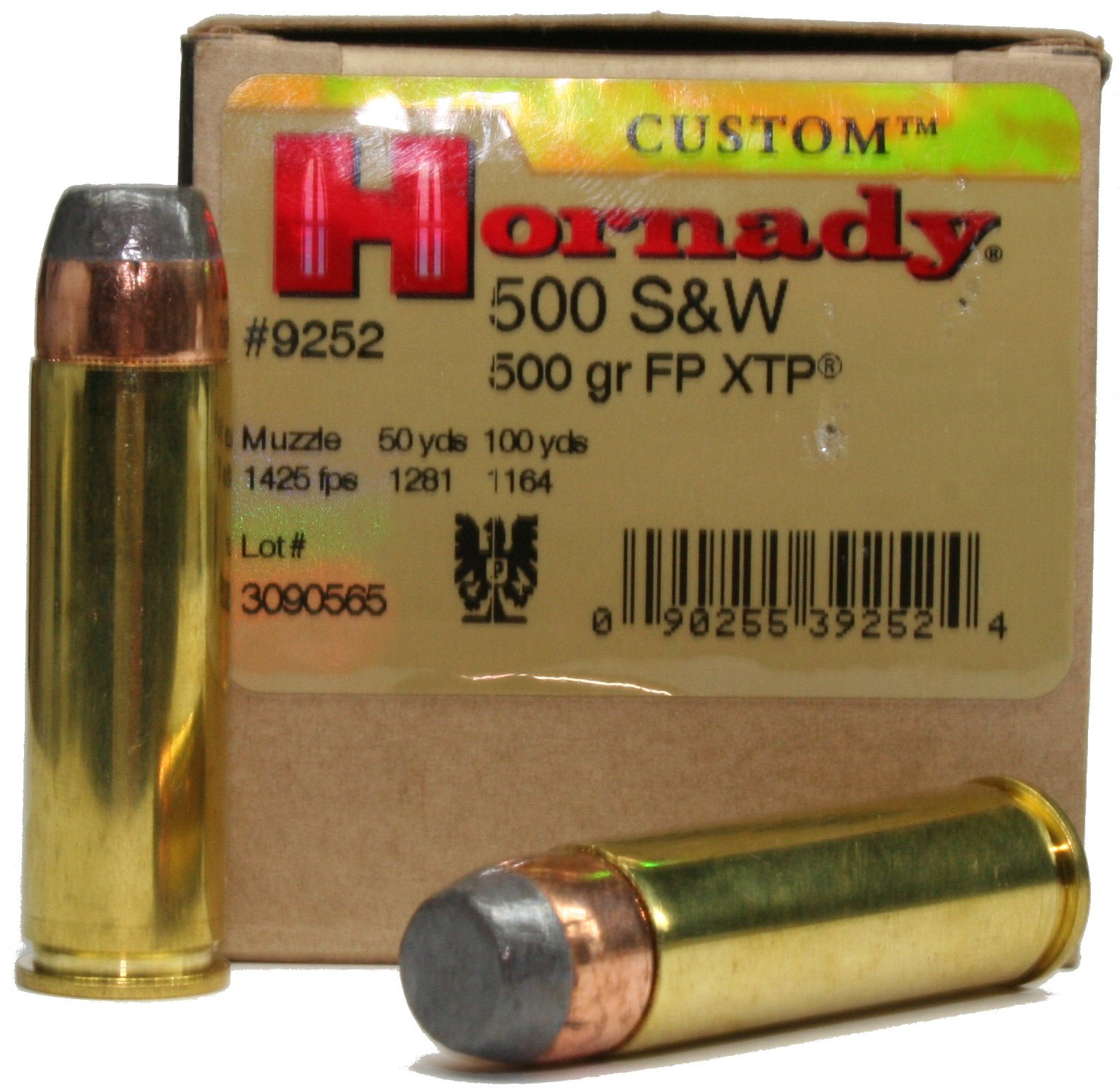
500 S&W Magnum hunting load with 500 gr. SP bullet by Hornady

The .500 S&W Magnum was originally designed to be primarily a handgun hunting cartridge. It also serves a secondary purpose as a back-up survival handgun cartridge as a defense against the large bears of North America.

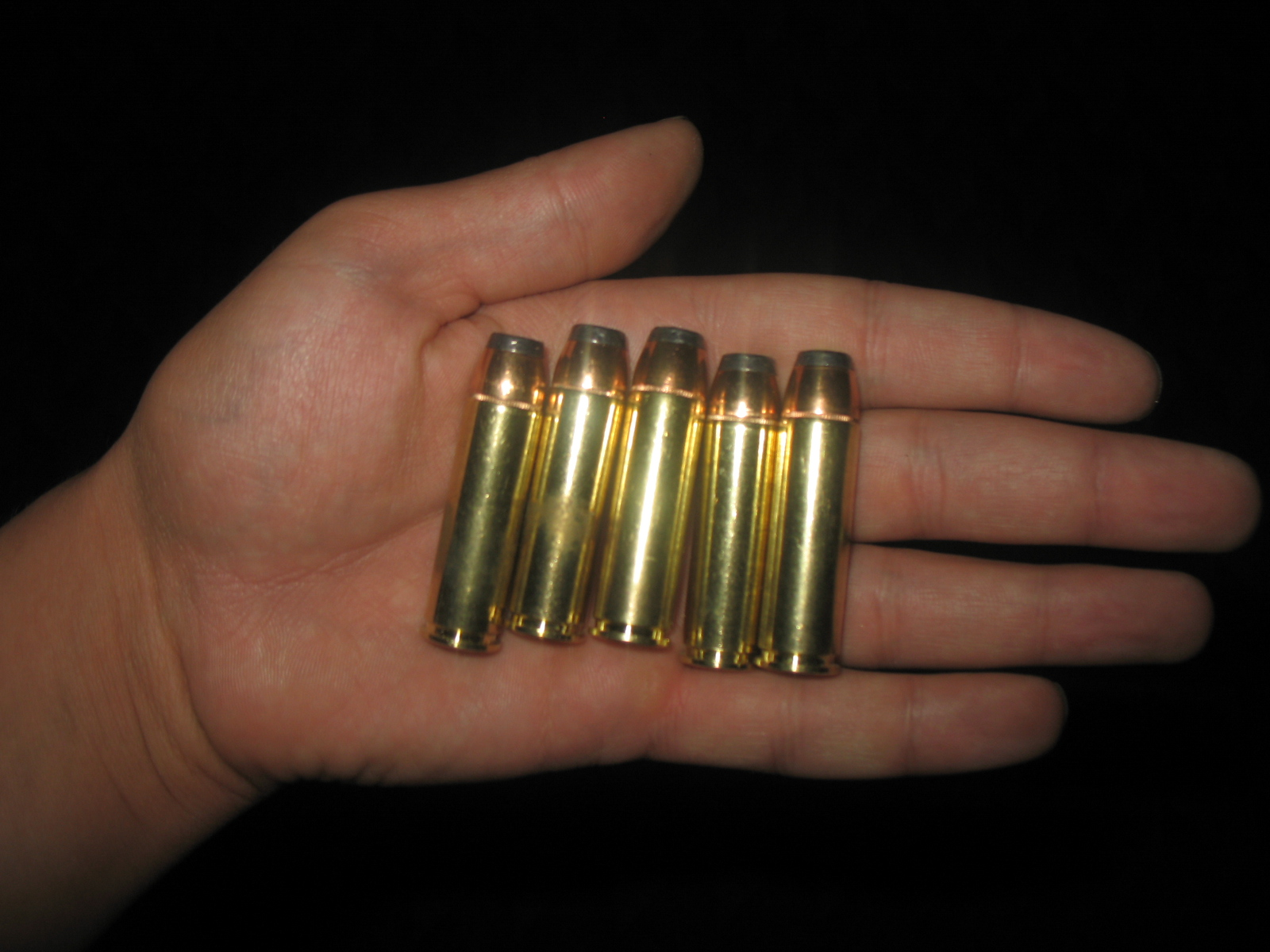
Size comparison of a 500 S&W round and a human hand

The .500 S&W Magnum's success with large, dangerous game is in part due to the availability of heavier bullets with exceptional sectional densities. Bullets above 500-grain (32 g) have the sectional densities required for hunting heavier African dangerous game. As a hunting cartridge, the .500 S&W Magnum has been found to be effective against elephant and African buffalo as long as ranges are kept within reasonable limits. Bullet selection is extremely important when hunting thick-skinned dangerous game. Smith & Wesson bills the Model 500 revolver as "A Hunting Handgun For Any Game Animal Walking".

In North America, it serves the purpose of hunting all North American big game species. The cartridge has had success in taking Alaskan brown bear, American bison, moose, and elk. It is also used to hunt black bear, whitetail deer, wild boar, and feral hogs. The cartridge gained some notoriety as being the cartridge which was used to hunt the supposed Monster Pig.

Bullets ranging from 275–325 gr (17.8–21.1 g) can be used for light CXP2 game species. Bullets heavier than 350 gr (23 g), including Winchester's reduced-load ammunition, are appropriate for use with CXP3 game species. Bullets over 500 gr (32 g) can be used for dangerous game. Hornady's 500 gr. SP load is rated for CXP4 class dangerous game by Hornady out to 200 yd (180 m) against dangerous game, based on Hornady Index of Terminal Standards (H.I.T.S.) calculations.

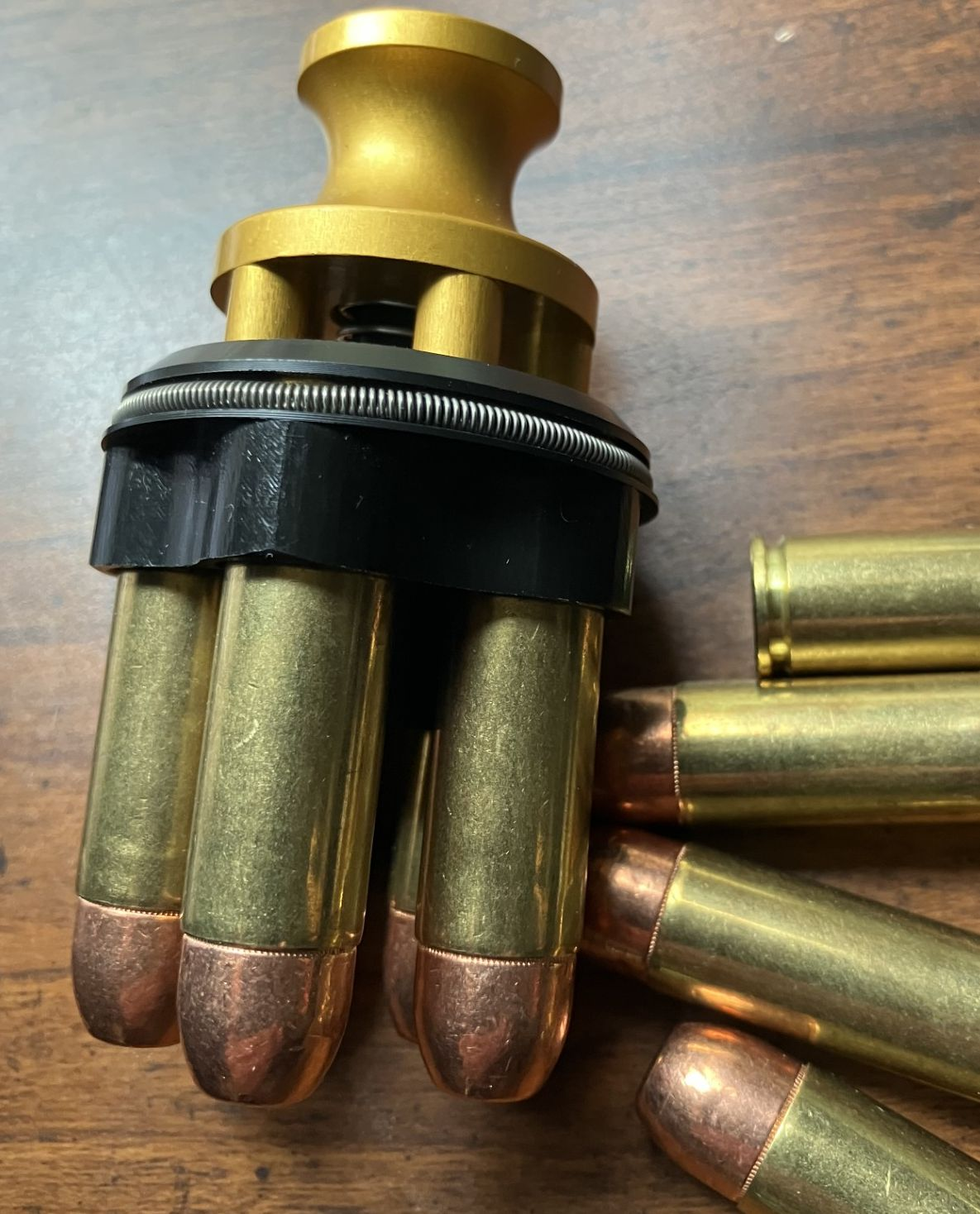
.500 S&W Magnum cartridges in a speedloader

The .500 S&W Magnum is available in firearms more convenient to carry than a full-sized rifle. This lends to its use as a defensive carry firearm in areas where dangerous predatory species may be encountered. The .500 S&W Magnum cartridge has found use in survival guns such as the NEF Handi Rifle and the S&W Survival Kit. Smith & Wesson manufactured a 2.75-inch-barrel (70 mm) version of the Model 500 revolver (model 500ES, whose production ended in December 2009), which was included in the S&W Survival Kit. This shorter-barreled revolver is handier, weighing 56 oz (1.6 kg), and has no compensator, which comes standard with the more common S&W 500 revolvers, such as the 8.375 in (212.7 mm) model.

== Firearms and ammunition ==
Currently there are several .50 caliber handguns which are capable of firing the .500 S&W Magnum. These types of revolvers normally have five rounds to allow for thicker cylinder walls to accommodate the pressure generated by the large and powerful cartridge. Big Horn Armory's Model 89 carbine and rifle are currently the only repeating long guns chambered in this cartridge. The single shot Thompson-Center Encore, NEF Handi Rifle, and Towner pump rifle are also chambered for this round. Magnum Research manufacturers the single action Big Frame Revolver for the .500 S&W Magnum with barrel lengths up to 10 in (25 cm). Due to the longer cylinders and tighter tolerances typical of these handguns, many shooters have observed higher velocities with the BFR than from the S&W Model 500 while employing the same loadings.

== See also ==
- 12 mm caliber
- List of handgun cartridges
- Table of handgun and rifle cartridges
