= .480 Ruger =

Revolver cartridge designed by Sturm, Ruger and Hornady

- Type: Handgun
- Place of origin: United States

Production history
- Designer: Hornady / Sturm, Ruger
- Designed: 2001
- Produced: 2001–present

Specifications
- Parent case: .475 Linebaugh
- Case type: Semi-rimmed, straight
- Bullet diameter: .476 in (12.1 mm)
- Land diameter: .465 in (11.8 mm)
- Neck diameter: .504 in (12.8 mm)
- Base diameter: .504 in (12.8 mm)
- Rim diameter: .540 in (13.7 mm)
- Rim thickness: .065 in (1.7 mm)
- Case length: 1.285 in (32.6 mm)
- Overall length: 1.650 in (41.9 mm)
- Primer type: Large pistol
- Maximum pressure: 48,000 psi (330 MPa)

Ballistic performance
Bullet mass/type	Velocity	Energy
325 gr (21 g) XTP Hornady	1,350 ft/s (410 m/s)	1,315 ft⋅lbf (1,783 J)
410 gr (27 g) Buffalo Bore LBT-WFN	1,200 ft/s (370 m/s)	1,311 ft⋅lbf (1,777 J)
- Test barrel length: 7.5"; Sources: Buffalo Bore "Cartridges of the World"

The .480 Ruger (12.1×33mmR) is a large, high-power revolver cartridge, introduced in 2001 by Ruger and Hornady. It was the first new cartridge introduced by Ruger, and when introduced, was the second largest-diameter production revolver cartridge, at .475 in (12.1 mm).

== Design ==
The .475 Linebaugh was introduced around 1988, for a custom, five-shot Ruger Blackhawk single-action revolver. The .475 is a wildcat cartridge made by cutting a .45-70 case to a length of 1.4 inches (36 mm), and necking it to accept a .475 bullet. The .475 Linebaugh is an immensely powerful cartridge, almost as powerful as the .454 Casull, the most powerful production revolver cartridge at the time (the .475 generates about 1,800 ft-lbs of energy. The .454 can generate around 2,000 ft-lbs). The .475-diameter bullet allows bullet weights over 400 grains (26 g), a feat not possible with the .45 caliber cartridge cases, and the terminal ballistics of the heavy bullet, even when loaded to moderate velocities, were impressive. The .475 Linebaugh was designed for handgun hunting of large game, such as bear, where deep penetration is required for a quick, humane kill, and the heavy, cast Keith-style semiwadcutter bullets out of the .475 Linebaugh penetrated very well.

== History ==
When Ruger began to design their new cartridge, they started with the .475 Linebaugh super-magnum cartridge but went a different direction. Rather than using the Blackhawk, Ruger chose to chamber the new round in the double-action Super Redhawk, and designed the cartridge to fit in a 6-shot cylinder. The Super Redhawk was already the only 6-shot .454 Casull revolver in production, as all other makers used 5-shot cylinders to keep the cylinder walls thicker to handle the high pressures. The .480 Ruger uses lower pressures (48,000 psi) than the .454 Casull (65,000 psi) so the .454 Casull can produce higher velocities and more energy. Although, with much lighter bullets than available in .475 caliber. The .480 case was also .115 inches shorter than the .475 Linebaugh, at 1.285 inches, the same as the .44 Magnum. The .480's large diameter rim is also turned down, which is required to fit the 6 cartridges in the Super Redhawk's cylinder without interference.

The .480 Ruger is viewed by some as a ".475 Special", a slightly downgraded version of the super-magnum cartridge. In fact, .480 Ruger rounds will fit and function in a .475 Linebaugh revolver, just as a .44 Special will fit and function in revolvers chambered for the .44 Magnum. Reviewing the .480's ballistics, however, reveals this is somewhat misleading, as this "Special" reference may cause one to consider the .480 a low-powered target round when in actuality it is much closer to its more powerful cousin the .475 Linebaugh than the .44 Special is to the .44 Magnum. The .480 Ruger operates at a maximum pressure of 48,000 psi, whereas the Linebaugh has a maximum pressure of 50,000, showing how close indeed the two cartridges are. Depending on load, the .480 Ruger can easily reach within 150 ft/s (46 m/s) of the .475 Linebaugh, making it a very formidable hunting cartridge for large and dangerous game.

The initial response to the .480 Ruger was mixed, as many reviewers compared it unfavorably to the more powerful .475 Linebaugh or .454 Casull, and wondered why Ruger had bothered to introduce a lower-powered cartridge. (This was based on muzzle energy alone, with no regard to either bullet diameter or weight, or to TKO, as was evident in the sales literature and magazines of the times, which compared the new 325 gr load's muzzle energy to the muzzle energy of other handgun hunting cartridges.) Indeed, the first factory load, a 325-grain (21.1 g) bullet at 1,350 ft/s (410 m/s), is nearly within reach of the .44 Magnum. However, with bullets of 400 grains (26 g) and higher, the .480 Ruger starts to show more potential. The standard .44 Magnum powders, in similar amounts, will push a 400-grain (26 g) bullet at over 1300 ft/s (thus yielding a TKO factor around 35.28 vs. 34.62 for a 325 gr 454 Casull at 1,650 ft/s (500 m/s)). This provides 1,500 ft⋅lbf (2,000 J) of muzzle energy, about 50% more than commercial .44 Magnum loads, showing the .480 Ruger's good efficiency with the heavy bullets. The lower velocities and lower pressures mean the .480 Ruger has less felt recoil and muzzle blast than the higher-pressure super-magnums.

== Usage ==
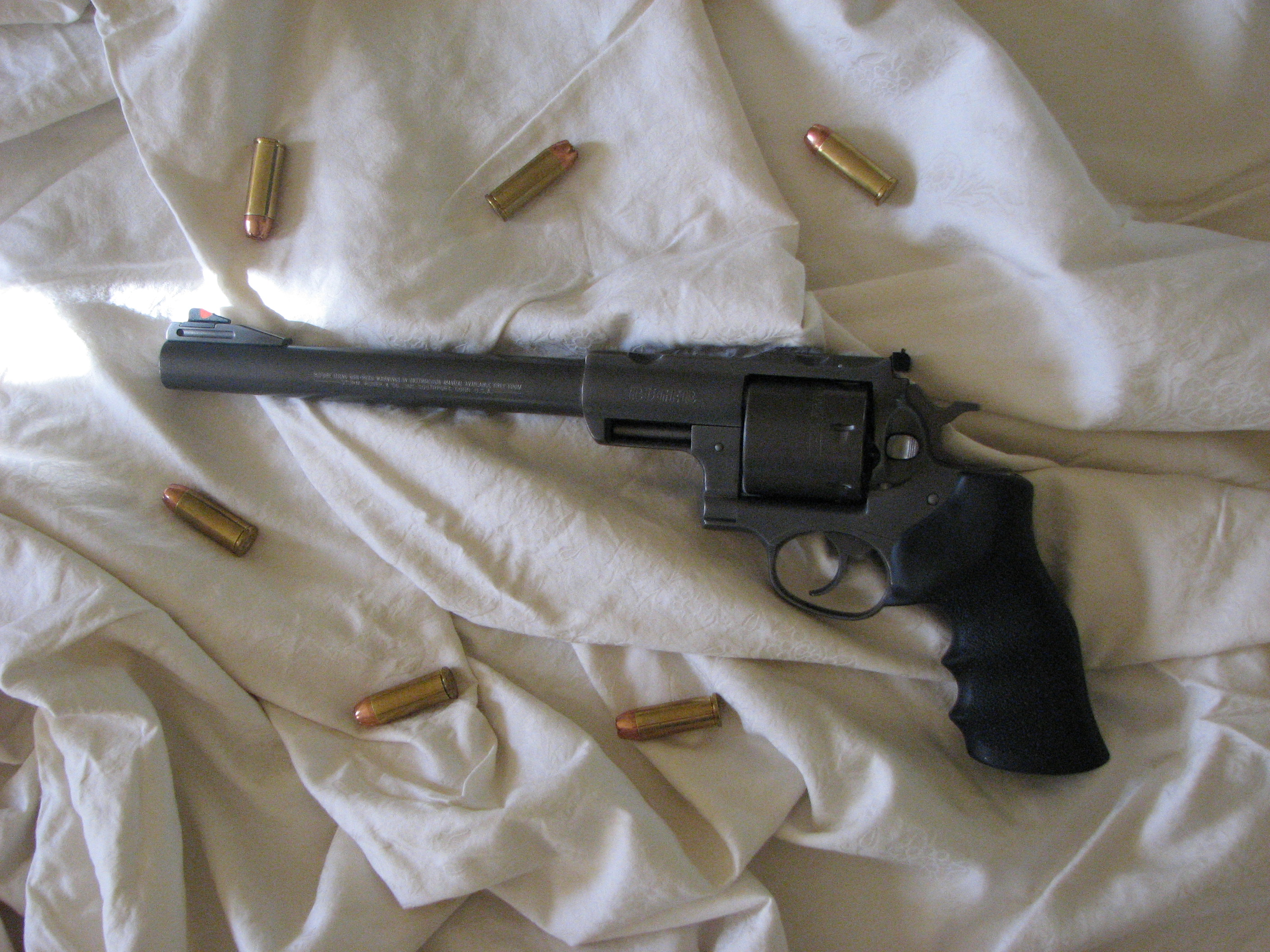
Super Redhawk with .480 Ruger rounds

The .480 is a well-balanced cartridge, providing a lot of energy without the recoil of larger hard-kicking rounds. It has been stated by many gun writers that the .44 Magnum is typically the most powerful handgun the average experienced shooter can master. The .480's original Hornady loading of a 325 gr JHP, easily surpasses factory loadings for the .44 Magnum, with very similar recoil in handguns of like weight. As a point of reference, the factory 325 gr bullet of the .480 Ruger has the same approximate sectional density as a 265 gr projectile in the .44 Magnum, which has been proven adequate for very large game species with hard cast or all copper or copper alloy bullets of similar weight. Phil Shoemaker, a very experienced Alaskan brown bear hunting guide with decades of experience, has used 260 gr hard cast bullets in his .44 magnum revolver for bear protection in Alaska. Essentially, the .480 Ruger is like a 22 percent bigger .44 magnum since it shoots bullets of similar sectional densities to the same approximate velocities as the .44 magnum with comparable barrel lengths, and the increase in sectional area of .475 caliber bullets over .44 caliber bullets is 22 percent.

The future of this round remains unsure. Magazine articles and online forums were, for a brief while, replete with discussions about the potential of the cartridge. However, lackluster sales and a limited number of firearms available in this caliber have shown it to have only moderate popularity. Handloaders reported getting phenomenal performance out of the round, rubbing shoulders with the .475 Linebaugh and easily equaling and even eclipsing the Taylor Knockout Value (TKO) of the .454 Casull, with less recoil, muzzle blast and noise due to the .480's lower pressures. Still, for the most part, the round was seen as not doing anything new, and available loads limited its potential for the non-handloader to mere deer hunting (for which many calibers already exist to serve that need).

After Smith & Wesson introduced its .500 S&W in 2003, and .460 S&W Magnum in 2005, the .480 fell even further into obscurity as it could not compete with the glitz of these new mega-cartridges. Revolvers chambered in .460 S&W Magnum can usually accept .454 Casull, .45 Colt, and .45 Schofield rounds as well (in the same way that a .475 Linebaugh revolver can take .480 Ruger), a useful cost-saving feature that can increase the appeal of the .460 over the .480 for some shooters, especially for practice sessions where full-power rounds are not necessary.

There were many handgunners that disliked the heavy Super Redhawk and waited for Ruger to release the cartridge in their Super Blackhawk single-action. This did not occur until August 2015, when a Bisley Super Blackhawk model in .454 Casull and .480 Ruger, was announced as a distributor exclusive through Lipsey's.

== See also ==
- 12 mm caliber
- List of rimmed cartridges
- List of handgun cartridges
- Table of handgun and rifle cartridges
