= Prabal =

India's first long-range revolver

- Type: Revolver
- Place of origin: India

Production history
- Manufacturer: Advanced Weapons and Equipment India
- Unit cost: 1.26 - 1.4 Lakh Rupees
- Produced: 18 August 2023

Specifications
- Mass: ≈ 700 g (1.5 lb) excluding cartridges
- Length: 177.6 mm (6.99 in)
- Barrel length: 76 mm (3.0 in)
- Caliber: 0.32 mm
- Effective firing range: ≈ 50 m (55 yd)

Prabal is India's first long-range revolver manufactured by the Advanced Weapons and Equipment India (AWEIL).

== Design ==
With a length of 177.6 mm and having a side swing cylinder, it weighs about 700 grams.

The .32 bore has a firing range of up to 50 metres which is almost double the standard firing range of most revolvers.

This indigenous revolver is accessible to both arms dealers and civilians who possess a valid license in India.

== See also ==
- Arms Act, 1959
- Ruger GP100
- Webley Revolver
- Nidar
- Nirbheek
- Ashani pistol
- IOF .22 Revolver
- IOF .32 Revolver
