= IOF .22 revolver =

Firearm made by the Indian Ordnance Factory

The IOF .22 revolver is a .22 caliber revolver made by the Indian Ordnance Factory in 2002.

== Design ==
The revolver's cylinder can hold eight cartridges and has a single-action and double-action trigger.

== See also ==
- Prabal
- Nidar
- Nirbheek
- Ashani pistol
- IOF .32 Revolver
