= .32 caliber =

.32 caliber is a size of ammunition, fitted to firearms with a bore diameter of 0.32 inches (8.1 mm).

== Handgun chamberings ==
- .32 rimfire, chambered in revolvers and rifles in the late 19th and early 20th centuries (1860)
- .32 Webley, a centerfire version of the .32 Rimfire (1868)
- .32 Long Colt, an American centerfire fire revolver cartridge and an improved version of the .32 Webley (1873)
- .32-20 Winchester, a rifle cartridge that found popularity in handguns as a powerful .32-caliber offering (1882)
- .32 S&W, cartridge was introduced in 1878 for the Smith & Wesson model 1 1/2 revolver (1892)
- .32 S&W Long, a straight-walled, centerfire, rimmed handgun cartridge, based on the earlier .32 S&W cartridge (1896)
- .32 ACP (Automatic Colt Pistol), a pistol cartridge (1899)
- .32 H&R Magnum, a rimmed cartridge designed for use in revolvers (1984)
- .32 NAA, a cartridge/firearm system from North American Arms and Corbon Ammunition using a .380 ACP case (1996)
- .327 Federal Magnum, a rimmed "super magnum" cartridge based on the .32 H&R Magnum with elongated case and higher pressure (2007)

== Rifle chamberings ==
- .32-20 Winchester, the first small-game lever-action cartridge that Winchester produced (1882)
- .32-40 Ballard, an American rifle cartridge (1884)
- .32 Winchester Special, a rimmed cartridge created for use in the Winchester Model 94 lever-action rifle (1901)
- .32 Winchester Self-Loading, an American rifle cartridge (1903)

== See also ==
- 8 mm caliber
- 32 (disambiguation)
