= Charter Arms =

American firearm manufacturer

- Type: Private
- Industry: Small arms manufacturing
- Founded: 1964; 62 years ago
- Founder: Douglas McClenahan
- Headquarters: Shelton, Connecticut, United States
- Products: Revolvers
- Website: charterfirearms.com

Charter Arms Co. is an American manufacturer of revolvers. Since its founding in 1964, Charter Arms has produced revolvers chambered in the following calibers: .22 Long Rifle, .22 Winchester Magnum, .32 Long, .32 H&R Magnum, .327 Federal Magnum, .38 Special, .380 ACP, .357 Magnum, 9×19mm Parabellum, .40 Smith & Wesson, .41 Remington Magnum, .44 Special, .45 ACP, and .45 Colt.

The most famous revolvers manufactured by Charter Arms are the .44 Special Bulldog and .38 Special Bulldog Pug.

== History ==
Douglas McClenahan, a young gun designer who had previously worked for Colt, High Standard, and Sturm, Ruger founded Charter Arms in 1964 to produce handguns. The factory was located in Bridgeport, Connecticut, and its first revolver was a five-shot model called the "Undercover", chambered for .38 Special. McClenahan's innovation was to avoid using the side plate designs manufactured by other revolver makers for a one-piece frame, giving the new revolver a strength that allowed it to safely shoot high loads. McClenahan also reduced the number of moving parts used in the gun and created a transfer bar safety device for the firing pin that would later be copied by manufacturers such as Ruger and Colt. In 1967, McClenahan's lifelong friend, David Ecker, became part-owner of Charter Arms.

Production was later moved to Stratford, Connecticut, and a few years later, in 1978, Doug McClennahan retired from Charter Arms. David Ecker became the company's sole owner and brought his son, Nick, as part-owner to replace McClenahan. In 1988, the company was purchased by Jeff Williams, who renamed it to "CHARCO" and moved production to Ansonia, Connecticut. In 1996, the company filed for bankruptcy and two years later, closed its doors. However, the Charter design and mark were resurrected two years later by Nick Ecker and two other investors, who started the company back up under the name "Charter 2000", moving operations to Shelton, Connecticut. Basing their new line of weapons on the basic Charter Arms design, the new company has made a few improvements such as the use of a one-piece barrel and front sight. The one-piece barrels of the new models are machined with eight grooves instead of six for higher velocity, flatter trajectory and better accuracy. The new models feature a completely blocked hammer system so that the gun cannot fire unless the trigger is held in full rear position.

In addition to reintroducing the .38 Special Undercover and the .44 Special Bulldog, Charter 2000 produces revolvers chambered for .22 Long Rifle/.22 Magnum (the Pathfinder), .357 Magnum (the Mag Pug) and .38 Special (the Off-Duty and the Police Bulldog). In 2005, Charter 2000 announced that it would be filing for bankruptcy, blaming the costs associated with nuisance lawsuits for their financial trouble. After the company emerged from the bankruptcy, it was once again renamed to "Charter Arms", which it is still known as today. In September 2005, MKS Supply entered into an agreement with Charter Arms where MKS Supply would handle the sales, marketing and distribution for Charter Arms. In 2008, Charter Arms brought the new Patriot revolvers to the market. The Patriot revolvers were chambered for the .327 Federal Magnum, and were available in 2.2" or 4" stainless steel models. The Charter Arms web site as of August 2011 no longer lists this model under the products category.

Also in 2008, Charter Arms announced a new revolver: the Charter Arms Rimless Revolver. The new revolver would be able to load and fire rimless cartridges such as the 9mm, .40 S&W, and .45 ACP without the need for moon clips. Initially, the revolver was to ship in early spring, however, reported problems with the patents delayed the introduction. Charter Arms set a release date of April 2009 for the CARR. However, Charter Arms missed this deadline, and company representatives suggested a release date of "late July" of 2009. The CARR, which was subsequently called the Pitbull, finally reached production in August 2011. The first Pitbull models had a 2.3" barrel and were chambered for the .40 S&W cartridge as this was the most popular U.S. law enforcement round and would enable the Pitbull to be used as a back-up gun to the .40 service pistol. In October 2010 MKS discontinued the sales and marketing of Charter Arms. Charter now has taken over the sales and marketing function. At SHOT Show 2018, Charter introduced the .41 Remington Magnum Mag Pug and the .45 Colt Bulldog XL.

== Products ==
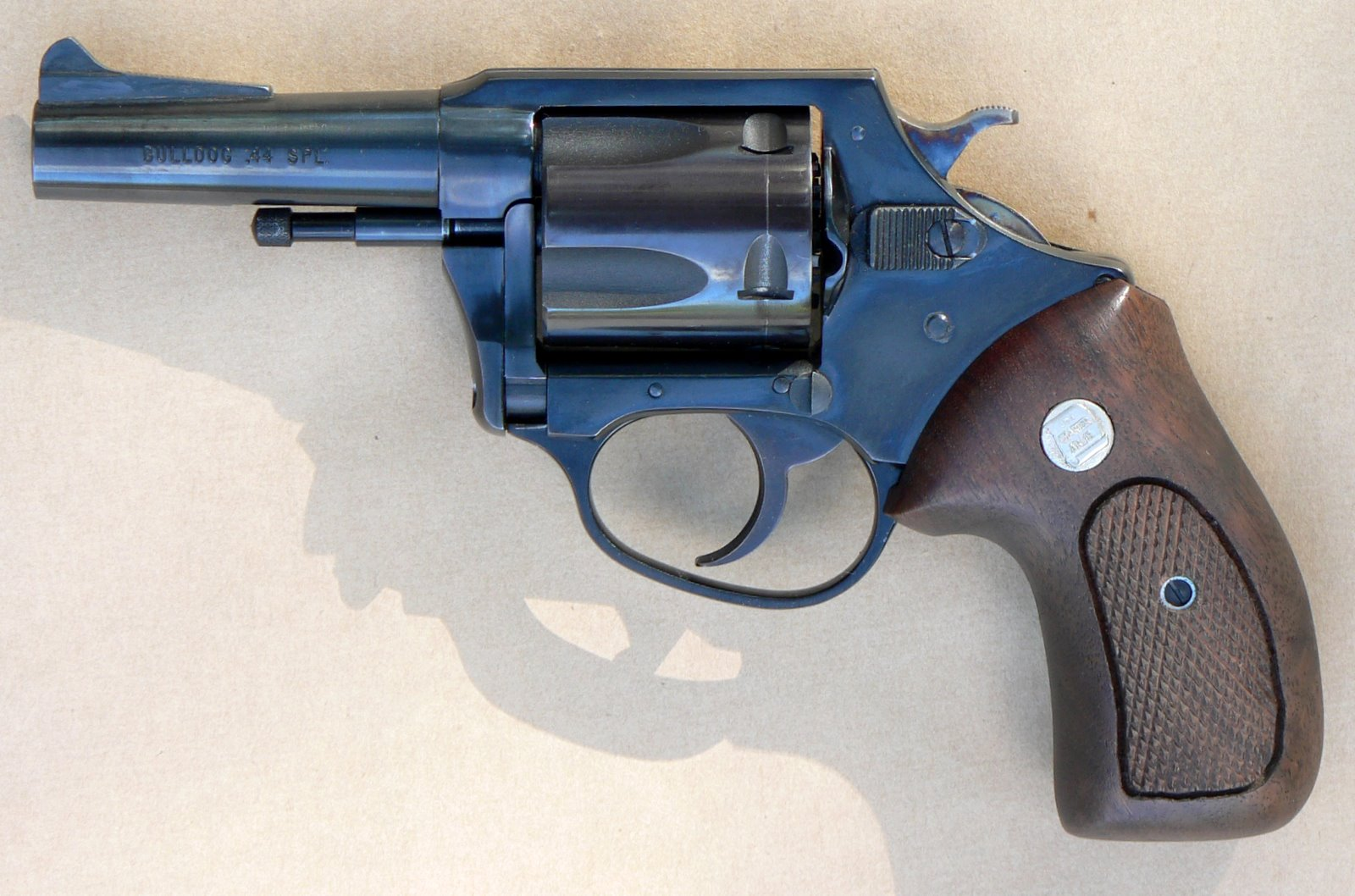
Charter Arms Bulldog .44 Special

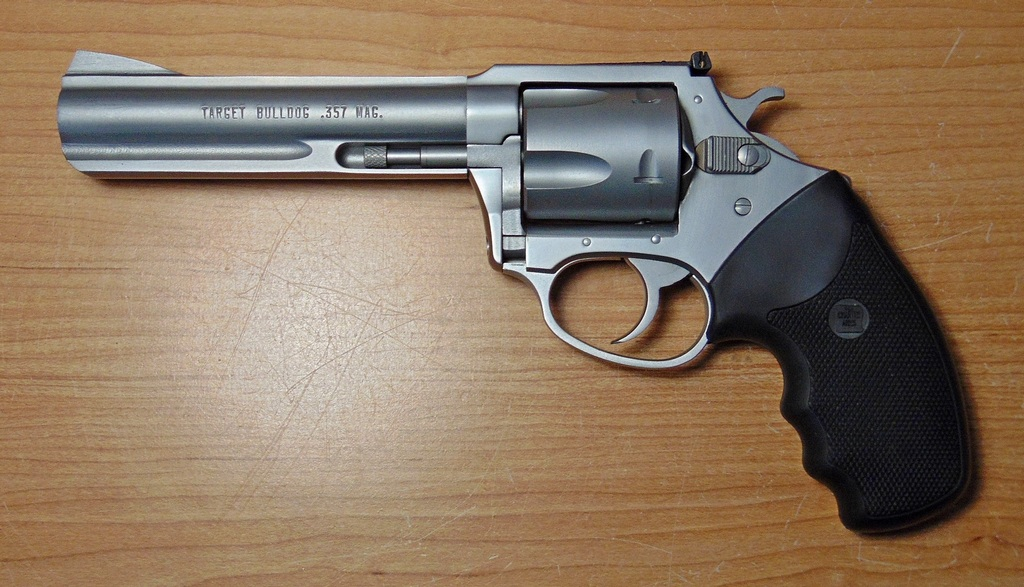
Charter Arms Target Bulldog .357 Magnum

- The Bulldog: .44 Special
- The Police Bulldog: .38 Special
- The Bulldog XL/Bulldog .45 Colt: .45 Colt
- The Target Bulldog: .357 Magnum
- The Undercover: .38 Special
- The Undercoverette: .32 H&R Magnum
- The Professional: .32 H&R Magnum and .357 Magnum
- The Mag Pug: .357 Magnum and .41 Remington Magnum (.41-caliber variant discontinued)
- The Patriot: .327 Federal Magnum (discontinued)
- The Pathfinder: .22 LR and .22 Magnum
- The Off Duty: .38 Special (similar to the Undercover but with a enclosed hammer and weighing 12 oz (340 g))
- The Dixie Derringer: .22 LR and .22 Magnum
- The Pitbull: 9×19mm Luger, .40 S&W, and .45 ACP (same frame as Bulldog and Pug)
- The Southpaw: .38 Special (similar to Undercover, but made for left-handed shooters)

== Criminal uses ==
- A Charter Arms "Undercover" .38 Special model was used by Arthur Bremer to attempt to assassinate George Wallace in 1972.
- The .44 Special Bulldog revolver gained notoriety after it was used by Son of Sam serial killer David Berkowitz in his murder spree.
- A Charter Arms "Undercover" .38 Special model was used by Mark David Chapman to murder John Lennon on December 8, 1980.
- A Charter Arms "Undercover" .38 Special was used by Mumia Abu-Jamal in the murder of Police Officer Daniel Faulkner on December 9, 1981.
- A Charter Arms "Undercover" was used by Van Brett Watkins Sr. to assassinate Cherica Adams, the girlfriend of former Carolina Panthers football wide receiver Rae Carruth in a drive-by shooting in 1999.
- A Charter Arms .38 Special was used in the murder of Phil Hartman.
