= .32 H&R Magnum =

US rimmed revolver cartridge

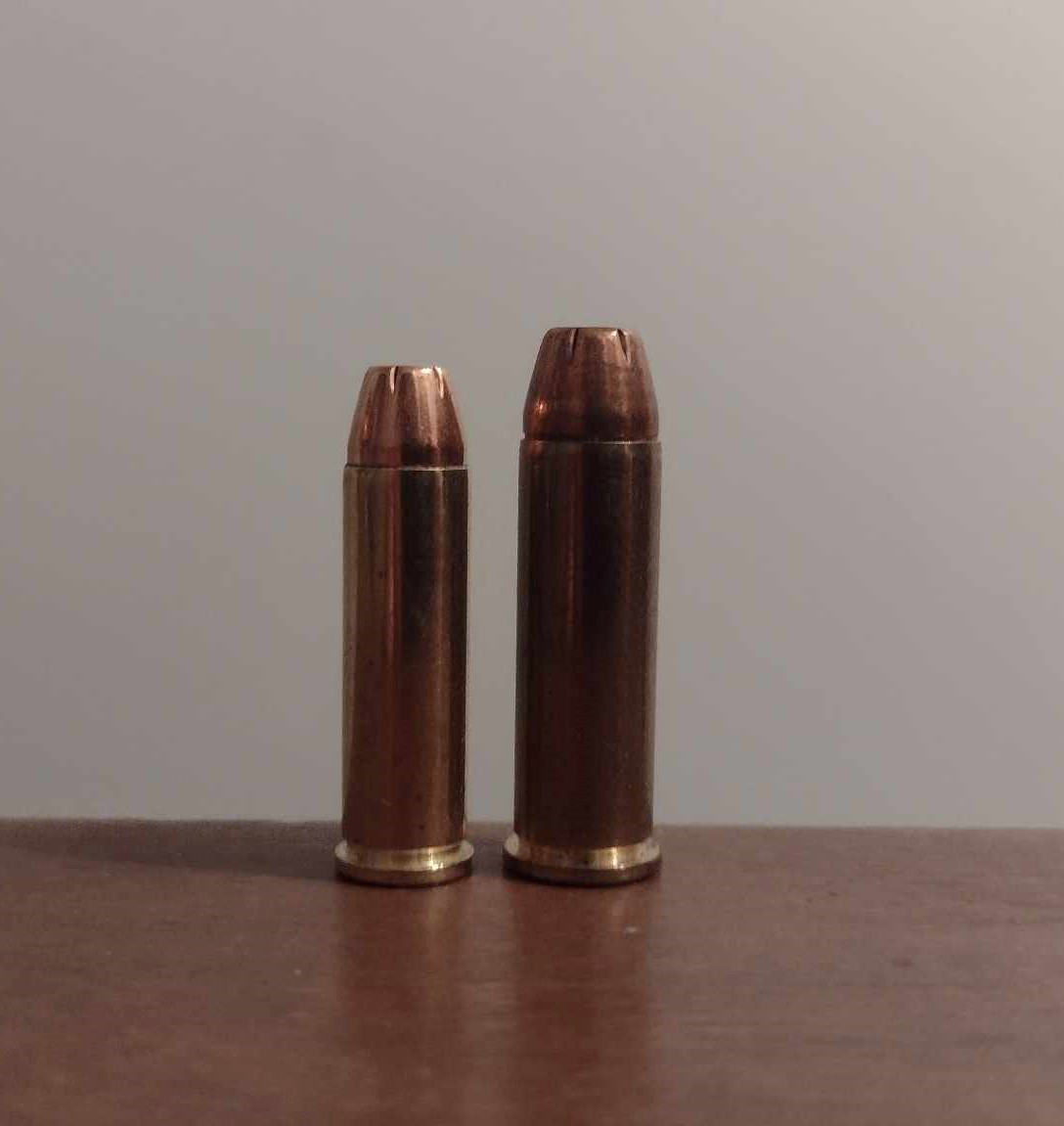
- .32 H&R Magnum (left) with a .38 Special (right)
- Type: Revolver
- Place of origin: USA

Production history
- Designer: Harrington & Richardson; Federal Premium Ammunition
- Designed: 1984
- Manufacturer: Federal
- Produced: 1984–present

Specifications
- Parent case: .32 S&W Long
- Case type: Rimmed, straight
- Bullet diameter: .312 in (7.9 mm)
- Neck diameter: .337 in (8.6 mm)
- Base diameter: .337 in (8.6 mm)
- Rim diameter: .375 in (9.5 mm)
- Rim thickness: .055 in (1.4 mm)
- Case length: 1.075 in (27.3 mm)
- Overall length: 1.350 in (34.3 mm)
- Primer type: Small pistol
- Maximum pressure: 21,000 psi (140 MPa)
- Maximum CUP: 21,000 CUP

Ballistic performance
Bullet mass/type	Velocity	Energy
77 gr (5 g) Cast LFP	998 ft/s (304 m/s)	170 ft⋅lbf (230 J)
85 gr (6 g) HP	1,263 ft/s (385 m/s)	301 ft⋅lbf (408 J)
90 gr (6 g) LSWC	963 ft/s (294 m/s)	185 ft⋅lbf (251 J)
90 gr (6 g) JHP	1,227 ft/s (374 m/s)	301 ft⋅lbf (408 J)
100 gr (6 g) JHP	1,208 ft/s (368 m/s)	324 ft⋅lbf (439 J)

The .32 H&R Magnum(7.65×27.3mmR), also known as the .32 Magnum, is a rimmed cartridge designed for use in revolvers. It was developed and introduced in 1984 as a joint venture between Harrington & Richardson and Federal Premium Ammunition.

The .32 Magnum was designed to be more than double the speed and energy of the less powerful .32 Smith & Wesson Long cartridge, on which it is based. Loadings for the .32 H&R Magnum even typically exceed hot .38 Special +P loads in terms of both speed and energy. The .32 Magnum also has a higher maximum pressure than the .38 Special. Federal would later stretch the case further to create the .327 Federal Magnum.

== Performance ==
The .32 H&R Magnum offers substantially more performance than most other .32 caliber handgun cartridges, such as the .32 ACP, and is considered an effective small-game hunting cartridge. When loaded to potential, the cartridge can provide similar performance from a handgun to the traditional .32-20 from a rifle. Though not always considered normative according to modern considerations, historically, this range of performance between the light and heavier expanding loads has proved efficient and versatile for many people, some of whom were evidently more than satisfied with relying on one rifle for both small game and medium-sized deer within reasonable range. Its higher velocity offers a flat trajectory, while the light weight of the bullet results in low recoil.

Maximum pressure for the .32 H&R Magnum is set at 21,000 CUP by SAAMI.

== Use ==
In 2013, Hornady introduced a .32 H&R Magnum "Critical Defense" cartridge designed for self-defense. It propels an 80 gr (5.2 g) grain FTX (flex tip), bullet at 1,150 ft/s (350 m/s) muzzle velocity. Buffalo Bore offers +P rated cartridges with either 100 gr (6.5 g) JHP or 130 gr (8.4 g) Keith hard cast SWC bullets.

Since the .32 H&R Magnum headspaces on the rim and shares the rim dimensions and case and bullet diameters of the shorter .32 S&W and .32 S&W Long cartridges, these shorter cartridges may be safely fired in arms chambered for the .32 H&R Magnum. However, the longer, more powerful .32 H&R Magnum cartridges cannot be safely fired in arms designed for the .32 S&W or .32 S&W Long.

In 2007, the .32 H&R Magnum was the basis for a "super magnum", the .327 Federal Magnum. The .32 H&R can safely be fired out of any firearm chambered for .327 Federal.

== Firearms chambered for the .32 H&R Magnum ==
=== Handguns ===
In addition to Harrington & Richardson, other manufacturers who have offered revolvers in .32 H&R Magnum include Dan Wesson Firearms, Charter Arms (professional seven round revolver), Freedom Arms, Smith & Wesson (J and K frames), Ruger (Blackhawk, Single-Six, GP100, SP101, Ruger LCR and LCRx), Taurus, and New England Firearms (NEF). In addition, any gun chambered for the .327 Federal Magnum cartridge can safely fire the .32 H&R Magnum cartridge (as well as the shorter .32 S&W and .32 S&W Long cartridges). American Derringer, Bond Arms, and Cobra Firearms offer derringers in .32 H&R Magnum, while Thompson Center Arms offered their Contender pistol in it.

=== Rifles ===
Marlin offered the Model 1894CB lever-action rifle in .32 H&R Magnum. Unlike other Marlin 1894s, the 1894CB loads from the front of the tubular 10-shot magazine, like their Model 39A rimfire rifle, and has a faster, 10% shorter throw, lever action. It has a 20 in (510 mm) tapered octagonal barrel, an overall length of 37.5 in (950 mm), and weighs 6.5 lb (2.9 kg).

== Gallery ==
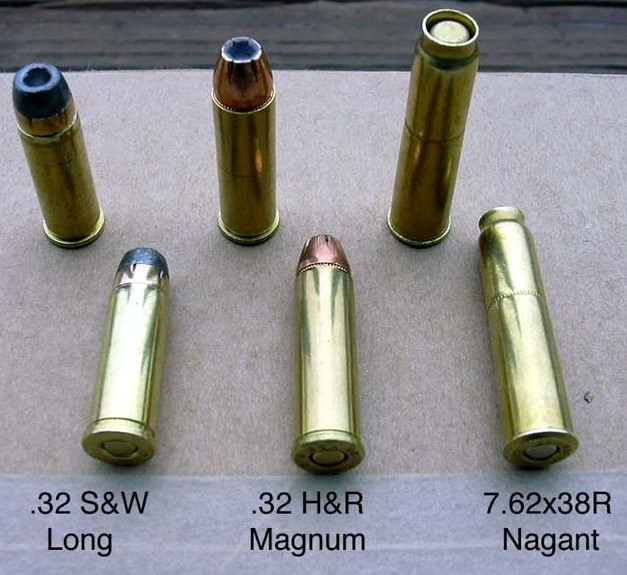
.32 H&R Magnum (center) in comparison with .32 Smith & Wesson Long and 7.62×38mmR Nagant

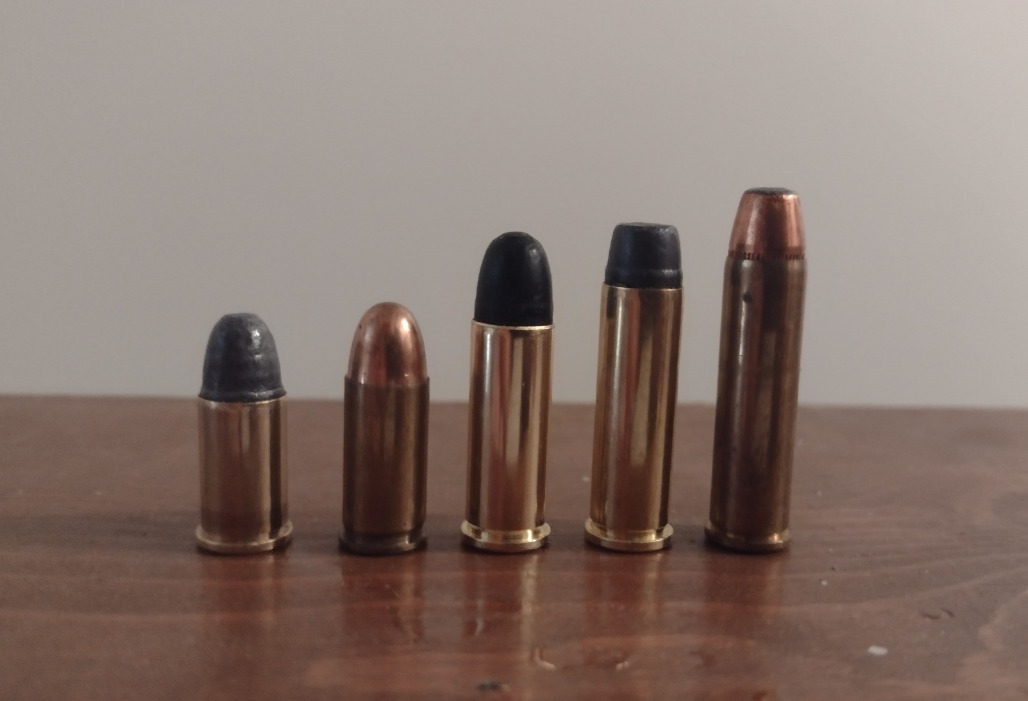
From left to right: .32 Short, .32 ACP, .32 S&W Long, .32 H&R Magnum and .327 Federal Magnum

== See also ==
- .30 Super Carry
- 8 mm caliber
- List of handgun cartridges
- Table of handgun and rifle cartridges
