= Hydra-Shok =

Type of hollow-point projectile

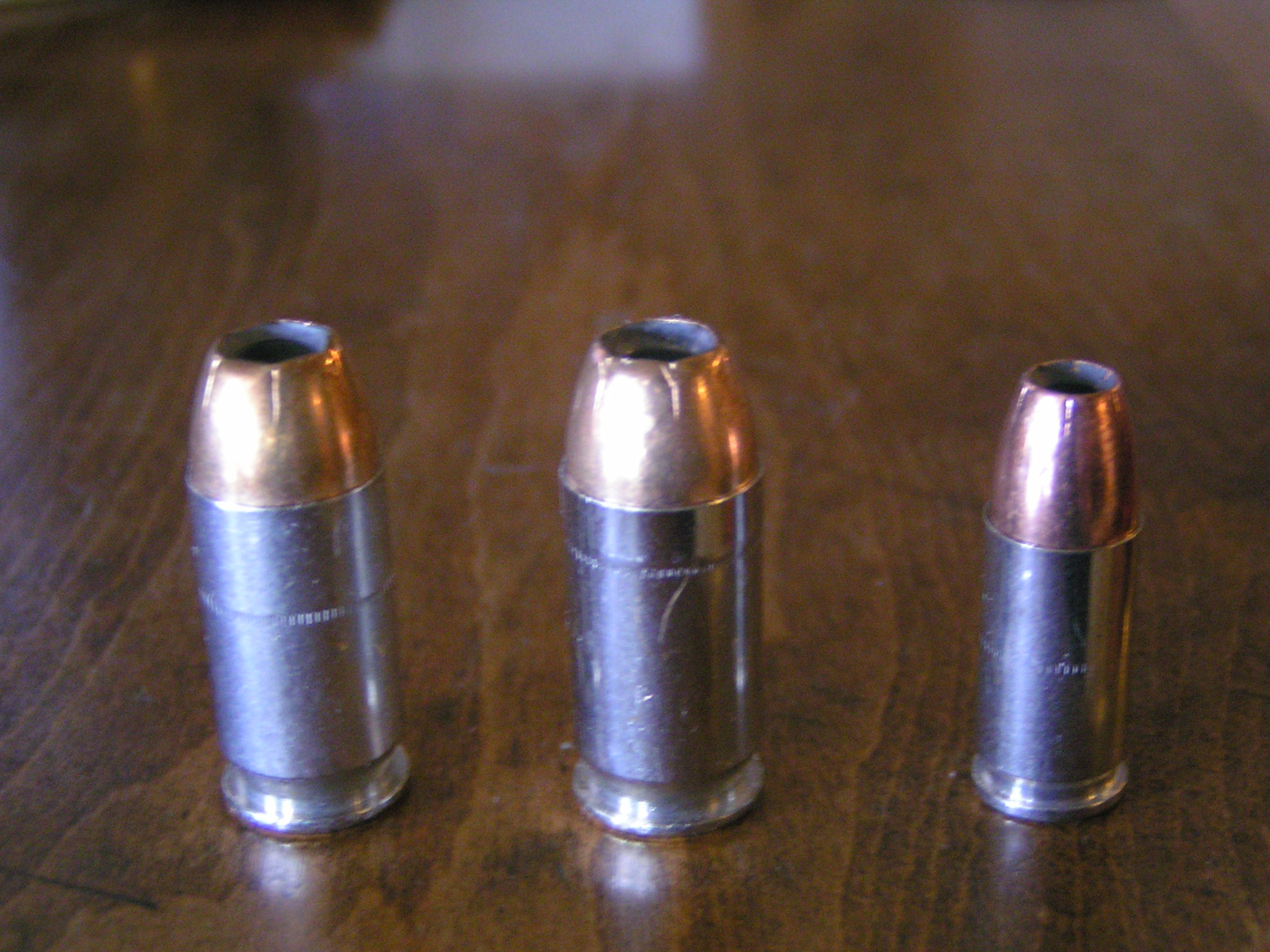
.45 ACP Hydra-Shok, .45 ACP Hydra-Shok (reduced recoil), 9mm Hydra-Shok

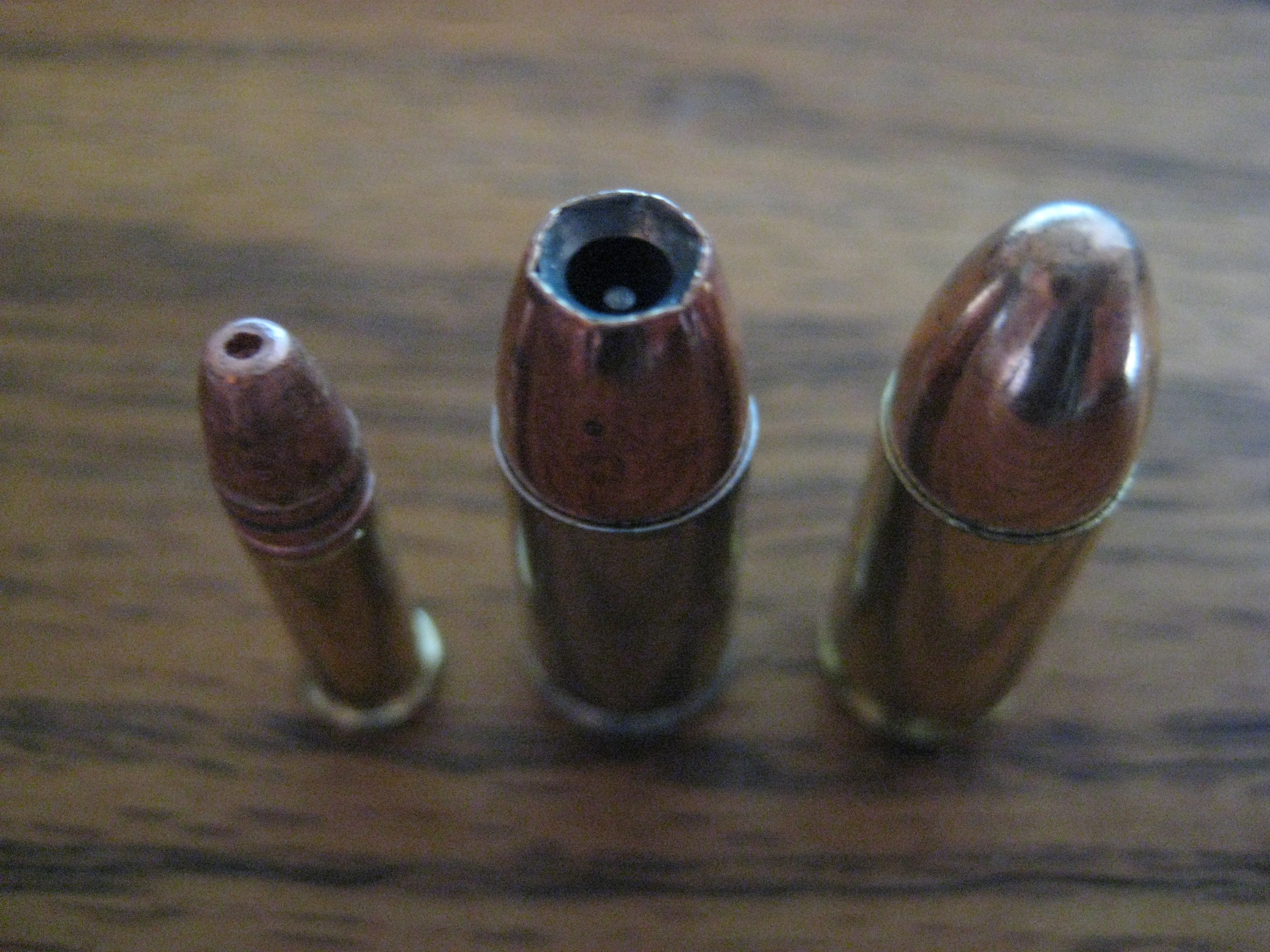
.22 LR HP, 9mm Hydra-Shok, 9mm FMJ

Hydra-Shok is a type of hollow-point projectile made by Federal Premium Ammunition. It was originally patented by ammunition designer Tom Burczynski. Hydra-Shok was released in 1988 after the FBI requested a bullet with better terminal ballistics than traditional cup and core projectiles.

== Design ==
The Hydra-Shok bullet features a hollow-point construction which contains a distinctive central post in the base of the hollow. This design makes such bullets easily identifiable in autopsy examinations of gunshot victims.

The manufacturer stated that the scored jacket and center post design provide a "programmed" expansion. There has been much debate regarding the bullet's unreliable expansion when fired through clothing or media other than ballistic gelatin. The bullet typically displays very rapid expansion, resulting in a larger but more shallow wound channel than would be typical from most other bullet configurations in the same caliber and of similar weight.

== Calibers ==
The Hydra-Shok is available in various calibers; 9x19mm Parabellum, 10mm Auto, .22 Winchester Magnum Rimfire, .32 ACP, .380 ACP, .38 S&W Special, .327 Federal Magnum, .357 S&W Magnum, .40 S&W, .45 ACP, .45 GAP, and .44 Remington Magnum. It can also be found in 12 gauge shotgun slugs.

== See also ==
- Gold Dot
