= Indian Ordnance Factories .32 Revolver =

IOF 0.32" Revolver
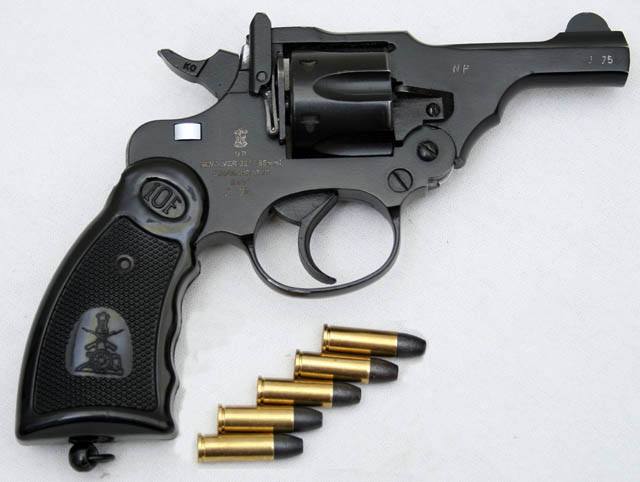
- Type: Revolver
- Place of origin: India

Production history
- Designed: 1995
- Manufacturer: Small Arms Factory, Kanpur
- Produced: 1996–present

Specifications
- Mass: 700 g (25 oz)
- Length: 177.8 mm (7.00 in)
- Barrel length: 76.2 mm (3.00 in)
- Cartridge: .32 S&W Long (7.65x23mm)
- Caliber: .32 (7.65 mm)
- Action: Double-action revolver, break action
- Feed system: 6-round cylinder
- Sights: Fixed open sights

IOF .32 Revolver (also known as IOF 32 Revolver) is a six-shot revolver designed and manufactured by Field Gun Factory, Kanpur.

== Design ==
The IOF .32 revolver is based on the Webley Mk IV .38 S&W revolver, specifically the Singapore Police Force version with a safety catch.

The smaller caliber was chosen so that it would be legal for civilian ownership under Indian law.

The revolver is a 'Break Action' self-extracting revolver and uses the .32 Smith & Wesson Long (7.65mm x 23mm) cartridge.

The revolver is priced at Rs.79,263 (approx. $1100 USD in late 2020) (ex-Kanpur) due to a lack of competition from private manufacturers.

== Variants ==
=== Nirbheek ===
Lightweight titanium frame version.

=== ANMOL ===
Longer barrel steel frame version.

== See also ==
- Webley Revolver
- Prabal
- Nidar
- Nirbheek
- Ashani pistol
- IOF .22 Revolver
