= .30 Super Carry =

Handgun cartridge introduced by Federal Premium Ammunition

- Type: Pistol
- Place of origin: United States

Production history
- Designer: Federal Premium Ammunition
- Designed: 2022

Specifications
- Case type: Rimless, tapered
- Bullet diameter: 0.312 in (7.925 mm)
- Land diameter: 0.303 in (7.70 mm)
- Neck diameter: 0.337 in (8.56 mm)
- Shoulder diameter: 0.338 in (8.59 mm)
- Base diameter: 0.342 in (8.70 mm)
- Rim diameter: 0.344 in (8.74 mm)
- Rim thickness: 0.050 in (1.27 mm)
- Case length: 0.827 in (21.0 mm)
- Overall length: 1.169 in (29.7 mm)
- Maximum pressure: 52,000 psi (360 MPa)

Ballistic performance
Bullet mass/type	Velocity	Energy
100 gr HST	1,250 ft/s (380 m/s)	347 ft⋅lbf (470 J)
100 gr FMJ	1,250 ft/s (380 m/s)	347 ft⋅lbf (470 J)
- Test barrel length: 4 inches Sources: Federal Premium, Gun University

.30 Super Carry (7.65×21mm), also known as .30 SC, is a rimless tapered pistol cartridge introduced by Federal Premium in early 2022.

== Description ==
It was designed for comparable performance to a standard 9×19mm Luger in a .312 caliber configuration and typically exceeds performance of the .380 ACP when utilized in semi-automatic handguns of similar size. Its smaller dimension is conducive to reconsidering existing handgun designs for greater capacity without increasing physical magazine size or decreasing cartridge performance below the perceived adequacy associated with long established alternatives.

David M. Fortier and Michelle Hamilton of Firearms News magazine noted the similarity to the 1918 vintage .30-18 Auto and 7.65×20mm Long cartridge when given an opportunity to test it prior to the .30 Super Carry's official introduction. Fortier pointed this out to JJ Reich, the Senior Media Relations Manager for Federal Premium. Ian McCollum of the Forgotten Weapons website/YouTube channel also noted .30 Super Carry is nearly identical to the older French 7.65mm French Long round, although the creators at Federal did not seem to be aware of this and created it independently.

The round when initially released by Federal was loaded for 45,000 psi (310 MPa). The maximum average pressure rating for this cartridge is 52,000 psi (360 MPa).

Among the first pistols chambered in .30 Super Carry were the Smith & Wesson Shield EZ 30 SC and the Shield Plus 30 SC.

In May 2023, Hi-Point released the Hi-Point 3095 carbine chambered in .30 SC.

In 2022, Nighthawk offered the (now discontinued) option of .30 Super Carry in their 1911 GRP pistols.

== See also ==
- .32 H&R Magnum
- .327 Federal Magnum
- 5.7×28mm NATO replacement for 9×19mm
- 8 mm caliber
- List of handgun cartridges
- Table of handgun and rifle cartridges
