= 8 mm caliber =

Firearm cartridge classification

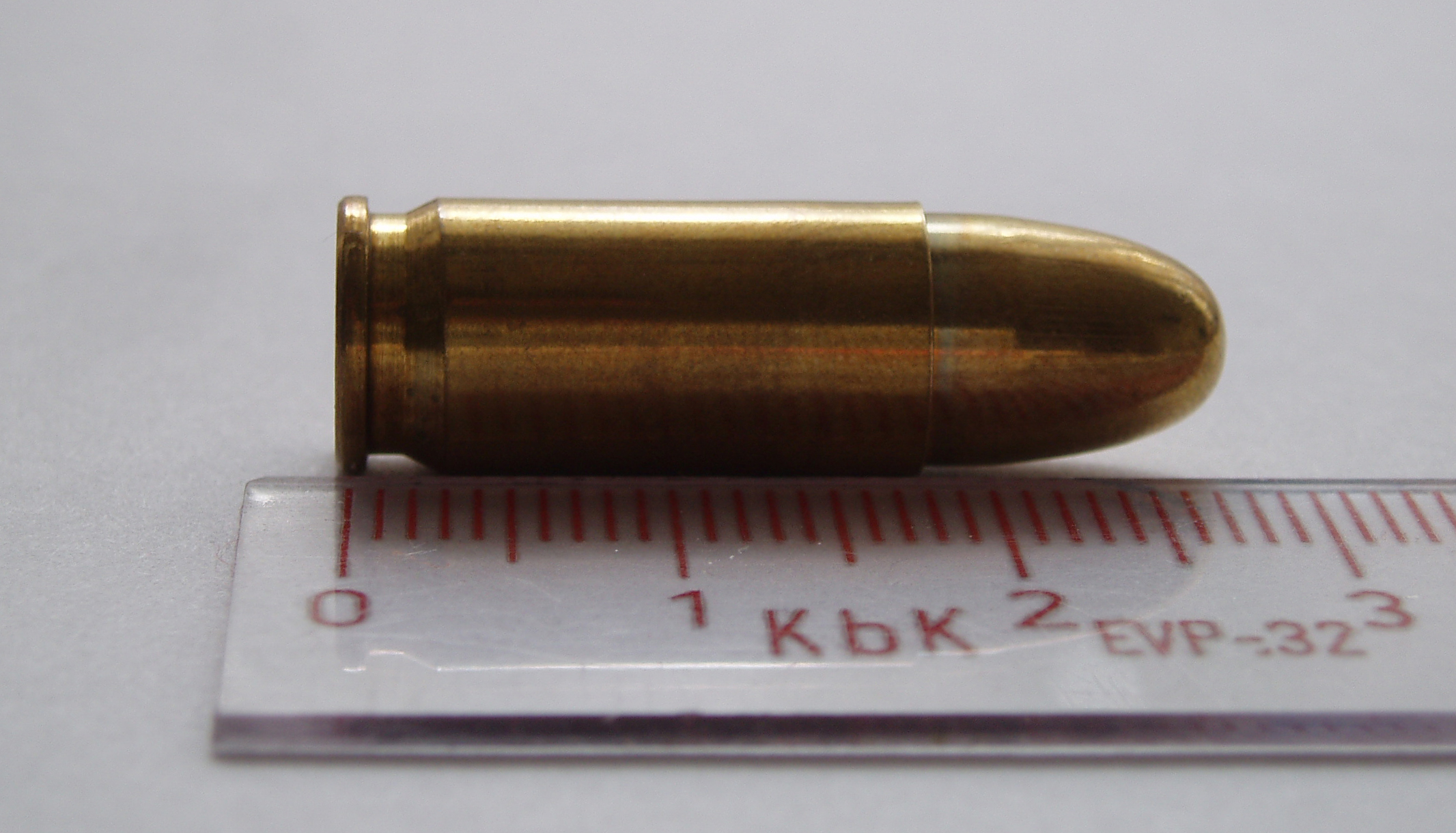
- Example of an 8 mm cartridge, an 8mm Roth–Steyr
- Firearm cartridges
- « 6 mm, 7 mm 8 mm 9 mm, 10 mm »

This is a list of firearm cartridges which have bullets in the 8-to-9-millimetre (0.31 to 0.35 in) caliber range.

- Length refers to the empty cartridge case length
- OAL refers to the overall length of the loaded cartridge

All measurements are in mm (in)

== Pistol cartridges ==
Name	Bullet	Length	Rim	Base	Shoulder	Neck	OAL
.32 ACP (.32 Auto)	7.94 (.3125)	17.3 (.68)	9.1 (.358)	8.6 (.337)	-	8.55 (.3365)	25.0 (.984)
.30 Super Carry	8.0 (.313)	21.0 (.827)	8.8 (.346)	8.8 (.346)	-	8.8 (.346)	29.7 (1.169)
8mm Roth–Steyr	8.16 (.321)	18.65 (.734)	8.85 (.348)	8.85 (.348)	-	8.8 (.346)	29.00 (1.142)
8×22mm Nambu	8.18 (.322)	21.25 (.840)	10.50 (.413)	10.32 (.407)	9.86 (.388)	8.73 (.340)	31.75 (1.25)

== Revolver cartridges ==
Name	Bullet	Length	Rim	Base	Neck	OAL
.32 S&W (.32 S&W Short)	7.9 (.312)	15 (.61)	9.5 (.375)	8.5 (.335)	8.5 (.334)	23 (.92)
.32 S&W Long	7.9 (.312)	23.37 (.920)	9.53 (.375)	8.56 (.337)	8.56 (.337)	32.51 (1.280)
.32 H&R Magnum	7.9 (.312)	27.3 (1.075)	9.53 (.375)	8.56 (.337)	8.56 (.337)	34.3 (1.350)
.327 Federal Magnum	7.9 (.312)	30 (1.20)	9.5 (.375)	8.6 (.337)	8.6 (.337)	37 (1.47)
.320 Revolver	8.052 (.317)	16 (0.62)	8.9 (.350)	7.9 (.306)	8.1 (.320)	24.5 (.95)
7.5mm 1882 Ordnance; 7.5mm Swiss Army Revolver	8.052 (.317)	22.61 (.890)	10.34 (.407)	8.763 (.345)	8.509 (.335)	32.77 (1.29)
8mm Gasser	8.11 (.319)	27 (1.063)	9.68 (.381)	8.6 (.339)	8.56 (.337)	36 (1.417)
8mm French Ordnance; 8mm Lebel Revolver; 8×27mmR Règlementaire Mle 92	8.204 (.323)	27.18 (1.07)	10.16 (.400)	9.753 (.384)	8.89 (.35)	36.58 (1.44)
7.5mm Swedish Nagant	8.255 (.325)	22.61 (.890)	10.31 (.406)	8.890 (.350)	8.331 (.328)	34.29 (1.35)

== Rifle cartridges ==
Name	Bullet	Case type	Case length	Rim	Base	Shoulder	Neck	OAL
.32 Ballard Extra Long	8.05 (.317)		31.50 (1.24)	9.37 (.369)	8.15 (.321)		8.05 (.318)	45.7 (1.80)
.32-40 Ballard	8.14 (.320)		54 (2.13)	12.9 (.506)	10.8 (.424)	-	8.6 (.338)	66 (2.59)
8×52mmR Mannlicher	8.14 (.320)		52.3 (2.06)	14.08 (.554)	12.46 (.491)	12.06 (.473)	8.93 (.352)	76.05 (2.994)
8×50mmR Mannlicher	8.15 (.321)		50.38 (1.983)	14.11 (.556)	12.48 (.491)	12.01 (.473)	9.03 (.356)	76.21 (3.000)
.32 Winchester Self-Loading	8.16 (.321)		31 (1.24)	9.9 (.390)	9.9 (.390)	8.8 (.347)	8.8 (.347)	48 (1.88)
8×58mmR Danish Krag	8.16 (.321)		58.00 (2.28)	14.6 (.575)	12.82 (.505)	11.93 (.470)	9.05 (.356)	78.00 (3.071)
8×56mmR Kropatschek	8.17 (.322)		56.02 (2.206)	15.74 (.620)	13.76 (.542)	12.15 (.478)	9.2 (.362)	81.95 (3.226)
.32 Winchester Special	8.18 (.321)		51.82 (2.040)	12.85 (.506)	10.72 (.422)	10.19 (.401)	8.77 (.345)	64.77 (2.55)
7.92×33mm Kurz	8.2 (.321)	Rimless tapered bottlenecked	33.00 (1.3)	11.9 (.470)	11.9 (.470)	11.2 (.431)	8.9 (.357)	49.00 (1.92)
.32 Remington	8.2 (.321)		52.3 (2.06)	10.6 (.418)	10.6 (.418)	10.0 (.394)	8.7 (.341)	64.52 (2.54)
.325 WSM	8.22 (.323)		53.34 (2.10)	13.59 (.535)	14.10 (.555)	13.665 (.538)	9.093 (.357)	76.2 (2.86)
8×57mm IS/8mm Mauser	8.20 (.323)		57.00 (2.244)	11.95 (.470)	11.94 (.470)	10.95 (.431)	9.08 (.345)	82 (3.228)
8×60mm S	8.20 (.323)		60.00 (2.362)	11.95 (.470)	11.98 (.473)	10.95 (.431)	9.08 (.357)	82.5 (3.25)
8×63mm patron m/32	8.20 (.323)	Rebated	62.81 (2.473)	12.18 (.480)	12.43 (.489)	11.51 (.453)	9.1 (.358)	84.62 (3.331)
8×64mm S	8.20 (.323)		64.00 (2.520)	12.00 (.473)	11.95 (.470)	10.85 (.427)	8.96 (.353)	87.5 (3.445)
8×68mm S	8.20 (.323)		67.50 (2.657)	13.00 (.512)	13.30 (.524)	12.15 (.478)	9.14 (.360)	87 (3.425)
8mm Remington Magnum	8.217 (.3235)		72.39 (2.850)	13.51 (.532)	13.02 (.5126)	12.36 (.4868)	8.99 (.354)	91.44 (3.60)
8mm Lebel	8.3 (.327)		50.5 (1.99)	16.0 (.630)	13.77 (.543)	11.6 (.457)	8.85 (.349)	69.85 (2.75)
8×56mmR Mannlicher	8.35 (.329)		55.63 (2.190)	14.05 (.553)	12.47 (.491)	12.00 (.472)	9.20 (.362)	75.91 (2.989)
8×59mm RB Breda	8.36 (.329)	Rebated tapered bottlenecked	58.84 (2.317)	11.92 (.469)	12.49 (.492)	10.80 (.425)	9.14 (.360)	80.44 (3.167)
.333 Jeffery Flanged	8.5 (.333)		64 (2.50)	15.9 (.625)	13.8 (.544)	12.3 (.484)	9 (.356)	89 (3.49)
8.6 mm Blackout	8.585 (.338)		42.80 (1.685)	12.01 (.473)	11.946 (.470)	11.531 (.454)	9.40 (.370)	63.25 (2.490)
.338 Norma Magnum	8.585 (.338)		63.30 (2.492)	14.93 (.588)	14.87 (.585)	14.50 (.571)	9.40 (.370)	93.50 (3.681)
.338 Winchester Magnum	8.585 (.338)		63.50 (2.500)	13.51 (.532)	13.03 (.511)	12.47 (.491)	9.39 (.369)	84.84 (3.340)
.338 Lapua Magnum	8.585 (.338)		69.20 (2.73)	14.93 (.588)	14.91 (.587)	13.82 (.544)	9.41 (.371)	93.50 (3.68)
.338 Whisper	8.59 (.338)		38.08 (1.499)	11.91 (.469)	11.83 (.466)	11.60 (.457)	9.11 (.359)	67.51 (2.658)
.338 Marlin Express	8.59 (.338)		47.90 (1.886)	13.92 (.548)	12.76 (.502)	12.60 (.496)	9.45 (.372)	65.62 (2.583)
.33 Winchester	8.59 (.338)		54 (2.11)	15.5 (.610)	12.9 (.508)	11.3 (.443)	9.3 (.365)	71 (2.8)
.338-06	8.59 (.338)		63.35 (2.494)	12.01 (.473)	11.99 (.472)	11.2 (.441)	9.37 (.369)	85.6 (3.37)
8,5 × 68 Fanzoj	8.59 (.338)		67.50 (2.657)	13.00 (.512)	13.30 (.524)	12.15 (.478)	9.45 (.372)	87.00 (3.425)
338 Blaser Mag.	8.59 (.338)		63.70 (2.508)	13.59 (.535)	13.84 (.545)	13.02 (.513)	9.36 (.369)	84.84 (3.340)
.338 Federal	8.6 (.338)		51 (2.01)	12.0 (.473)	11.9 (.470)	11.5 (.454)	9.4 (.369)	70 (2.75)
.338 Ruger Compact Magnum	8.6 (.338)		51.2 (2.015)	13.5 (.532)	13.5 (.532)	13.1 (.515)	10.3 (.405)	72.1 (2.840)
.338 Remington Ultra Magnum	8.6 (.338)		70.1 (2.760)	13.6 (.534)	13.97 (.55)	13.6 (.5261)	9.4 (.371)	91.4 (3.6)
.338 Edge	8.6 (.338)		72.4 (2.850)	13.6 (.534)	14 (.55)	13.3 (.525)	9.4 (.371)	91.4 (3.6)
.338 Weatherby RPM	8.6 (.338)		64.77 (2.550)	12.01 (.473)	12.70 (.500)	12.036 (.4739)	9.25 (.364)	85.85 (3.380)
.340 Weatherby Magnum	8.6 (.338)		71.63 (2.82)	13.5 (.530)	13.0 (.513)	12.6 (.495)	9.3 (.366)	91.4 (3.6)
.338-378 Weatherby Magnum	8.6 (.338)		73.8 (2.905)	14.7 (.579)	14.8 (.582)	14.2 (.560)	9.2 (.361)	93 (3.65)
.33 Nosler	8.611 (.3390)		62.48 (2.460)	13.56 (.534)	13.970 (.5500)	13.452 (.5300)	9.398 (.3700)	84.84 (3.340)
.345 Winchester Self-Loading	8.8 (.345)		34.89 (2.255)	9.49	8.25		-	52.69
.348 Winchester	8.8 (.348)		57.3 (2.255)	15.5 (.610)	14.0 (.553)	12.3 (.485)	9.61 (.379)	71.0 (2.795)

== See also ==
- .32 caliber
