= Ruger LCR =

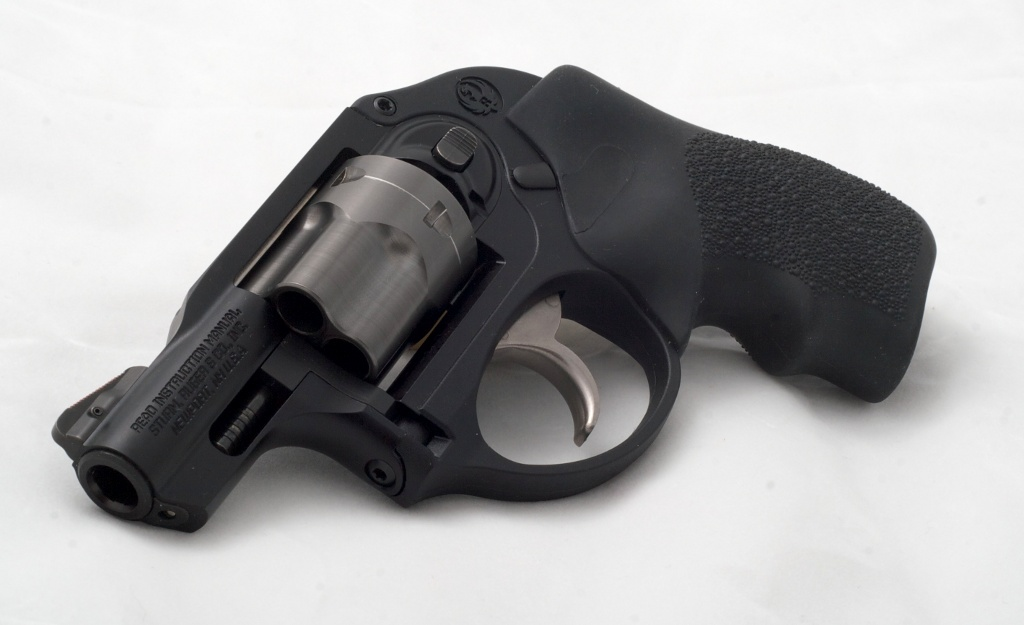
- Type: Revolver
- Place of origin: United States

Production history
- Designer: Joseph Zajk, others
- Designed: 2009
- Manufacturer: Sturm, Ruger & Co.
- Unit cost: $579–$669 (MSRP)
- Produced: 2010–2026
- Variants: LCRx (with external hammer)

Specifications
- Mass: 13.5–17.1 oz (380–480 g)
- Length: 6.5 in (170 mm)
- Barrel length: 1.875 in (47.6 mm) or 3 in (76 mm)
- Width: 1.28 in (33 mm)
- Height: 4.5 in (110 mm)
- Cartridge: .22 LR.22 WMR.38 Special +P.357 Magnum; 9mm Luger.327 Federal Magnum
- Barrels: 1:16" Right-Hand twist
- Action: Double-action revolver
- Feed system: 5, 6, or 8-round cylinder
- Sights: Fixed "U notch" rear and pinned ramp front sight (later models with the XS tritium dot front sight)

The Ruger LCR is a compact revolver built by Sturm, Ruger & Co. and announced in January 2009. LCR stands for "Lightweight Compact Revolver". It incorporates several novel features such as a polymer grip and trigger housing, monolithic receiver, and constant force trigger. At 13.5 oz (380 g), the LCR is nearly 50% lighter than the stainless steel SP101, as only the barrel and fluted cylinder are made of stainless steel.

== Description ==
The LCR operates in double-action only (DAO), as the hammer is concealed within the frame handle's fire control housing and cannot be cocked prior to firing. In order to create a lighter trigger pull, it features a friction-reducing cam.

The LCR was originally released chambered in .38 Special. In June 2010, Ruger released the LCR-357 chambered for .357 Magnum. With the rising popularity of the LCR, in December 2011 Ruger announced the new Ruger LCR 22, chambered in .22 LR with an eight-round capacity. In the summer of 2013, Ruger introduced a .22 Winchester Magnum Rimfire (WMR) version of the LCR, with a six-round capacity. In the autumn of 2014, Ruger introduced a five-shot 9mm Luger version, and a six-shot .327 Federal Magnum version a year later.

The LCR frame is aluminum alloy and synthetic glass-filled polymer finished in matte black with Synergistic Hard Coat. Per the Ruger website, the "monolithic frame is made from aerospace-grade, 7000 series aluminum in .22 LR, .22 Magnum and .38 Spl +P models and from 400 series stainless steel in the powerful .357 Magnum, 9mm Luger and .327 Federal Magnum models."

=== LCRx ===
Ruger announced the LCRx variant in December 2013, which features an external hammer, allowing it to be fired in single-action or double-action. All the other features of the LCR are also present in the LCRx including the polymer grip, trigger housing, and fluted stainless steel cylinder. A 1.87-inch (47 mm) barrel version of the LCRx in .357 Magnum and a 3-inch (76 mm) barrel version in .22 Magnum and .22 LR became available in April 2017. The 1.87-inch barrel version became available as a five-shot 9mm Luger and a six-shot .327 Federal Magnum in the fall of 2017.
