= Charter Arms Bulldog =

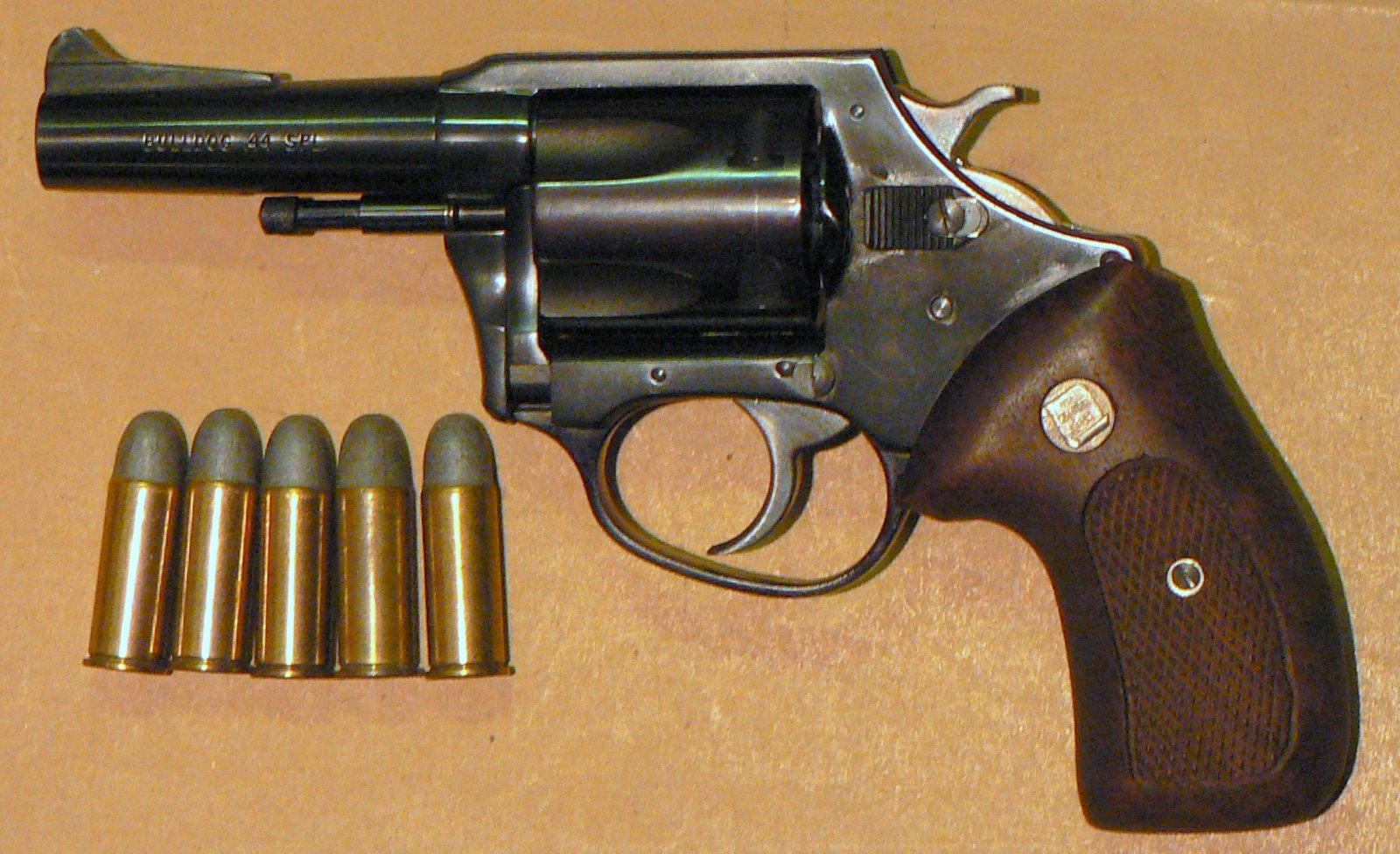
- Charter Arms Bulldog .44 Special with 5 rounds
- Type: Revolver
- Place of origin: United States

Production history
- Designer: Doug McClenahan
- Designed: 1971
- Manufacturer: Charter Arms
- Produced: 1973–present
- No. built: More than 500,000
- Variants: 13520, 14420, 7352, 74420 and 74421

Specifications
- Mass: 21.8 oz (620 g) and 20.1 oz (570 g)
- Length: 6.7 inches (171 mm) and 7.2 inches (184 mm)
- Barrel length: 2.2 in (55.9 mm), 2.5 in (63.5 mm), 3 in (76.2 mm), or 4.2 in (106.7 mm)
- Cartridge: .44 Special or .357 Magnum
- Caliber: .429 or .357 inches
- Action: Traditional double-action or double action only
- Rate of fire: Single
- Muzzle velocity: Usually between 705–1,000 ft/s (215–305 m/s); can reach 1,100 ft/s (340 m/s) with certain bullets.
- Feed system: 5-round cylinder

The Bulldog is a 5-shot traditional double-action revolver designed by Doug McClenahan and produced by Charter Arms.

== History ==
=== Charter Arms production ===
Designed by the founder of the first version of Charter Arms, Doug McClenahan, the Bulldog was released in 1973.

The name “Bulldog” was an homage to the original Webley revolvers of the same name.

It was a top-selling gun during the 1980s and it is considered to be Charter Arms' trademark weapon.

It was one of the best-selling weapons of the 1970s and the 1980s in the United States. Its design and execution, which were quite modern at the time, caught the attention of the gun press and combat shooters.

By the mid-1980s, more than half a million units had been produced and nearly 37,000 were being manufactured every year.

Bulldog production has been stopped a few times since 1992, when Charter Arms, the original manufacturer, went bankrupt.

=== Charco production ===
Sometime later, manufacturing began again under the Charco (descendant company of Charter Arms) trademark.

This company also filed bankruptcy, and the models produced during this period showed obvious production flaws.

=== Second Charter Arms production ===
It was produced again by Charter 2000; this company, which failed also, improved the weapon with a one-piece barrel, front sight, and ejector-shroud assembly.

The original model had no ejector-shroud, and the front sight was soldered to the barrel.

In June 2007, a version of the Bulldog with new features began to be produced by another company named Charter Arms, but this time was distributed by MKS Supply.

== Design ==
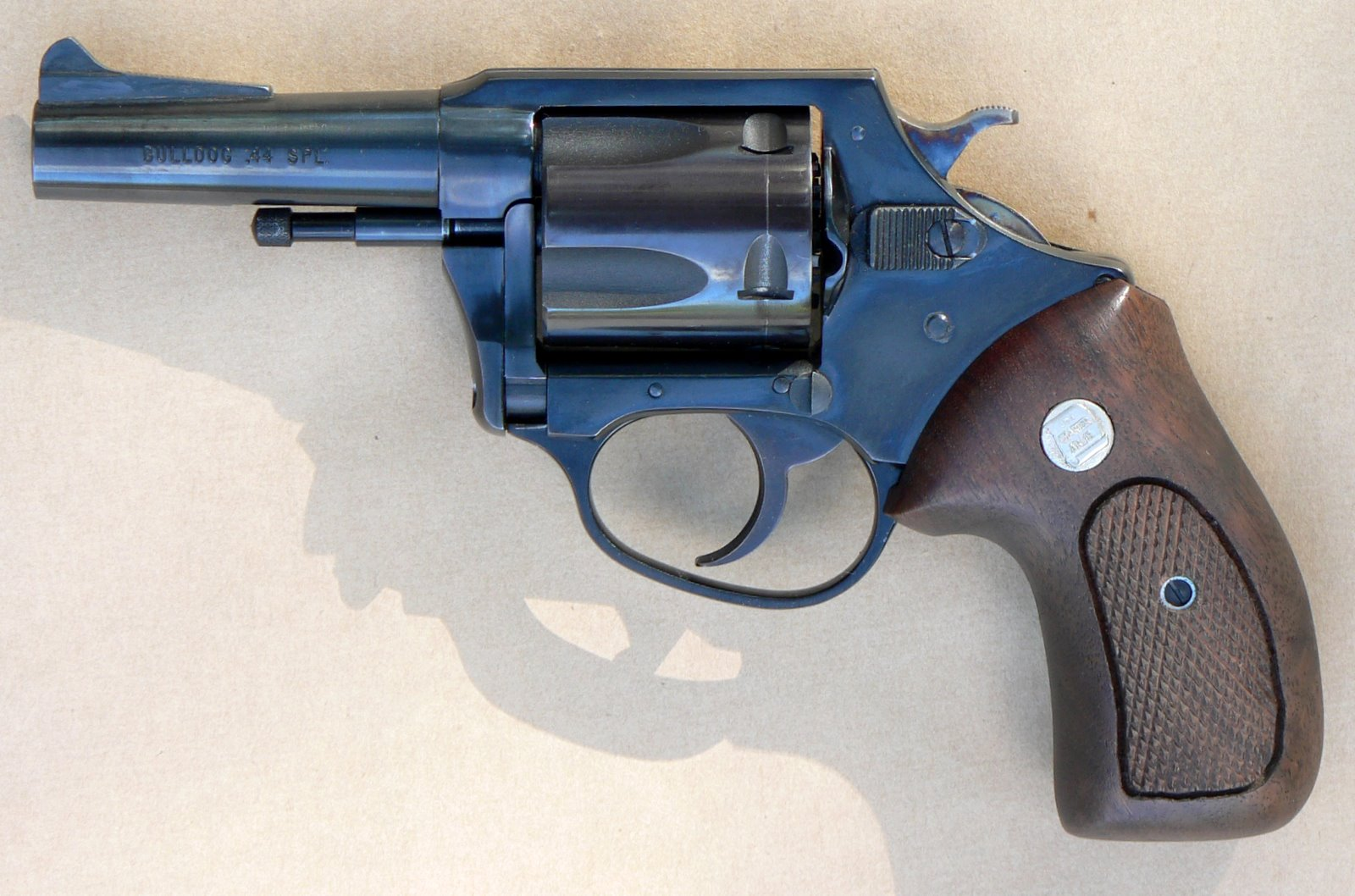
Older production Charter Arms Bulldog in .44 Special

Like most Charter Arms weapons, the Bulldog is a relatively inexpensive yet serviceable, no-frills, snubnosed revolver.

It was designed to be concealed easily because of its small size, yet also fire a "big bore" caliber.

The Bulldog has no sharp edges to contend with when carrying the weapon in a holster or a pocket.

The Bulldog is a solid-framed traditional double-action revolver with a five-round cylinder which can be opened by pushing a release slide on the left of the gun, or in the original model by pulling the ejector rod.

It features a concave sight. Its trigger pull, in both single and double-action modes, is quite light.

If a large quantity of residue piles up inside the revolver because of heavy usage, the cylinder crane's axle screw can be removed and the cylinder pulled out from the gun for cleaning.

Most critics believe the best use for the Bulldog is self-defense.

=== Performance ===
The accuracy of the Bulldog is aided by its trigger pull. According to reviews, it is more accurate than expected for a revolver of its size and type but probably not enough to be called an "accurate" weapon.

When the gun is fired, the hammer does not actually strike the firing pin. Under normal firing circumstances a small steel bar (called a transfer bar) is raised as the trigger is pulled, placing it into a position between the firing pin and the hammer itself.

The falling hammer strikes the transfer bar, which in turn strikes the firing pin, discharging the weapon.

If the trigger is not being pulled when the hammer falls, the transfer bar will not be in position and the weapon will not discharge.

=== Ammunition ===
Writer Jeff Quinn wrote: "..., as most modern .44 Special ammunition will shoot low with the popular lighter, faster bullets from a revolver of this type. With heavier, slower bullets, the .44 Pug shot very close to point of aim. .

With most ammunition types the muzzle velocity tends to be between 705 and 1000 feet per second (215 and 305 meters per second, respectively).

For self-defense the Blazer 200-grain (13 g) Gold Dot is, apparently, the load of choice for one user's Bulldog.

If the Bulldog is used to hunt, the most effective ammo is, reportedly, the 240- or 250-grain (16 g) SWC.

With this bullet type, the shot is very powerful and has a strong penetration, but the recoil can easily be handled. Other ammo types are weaker or provide too much recoil.

== Models ==
Five models of the Bulldog have been produced, allowing customers to choose between: .44 Special and .357 Magnum cartridges, gun lengths of 7.2 inches (184 mm) and 6.7 inches (171 mm) and barrel lengths of either 2.5 inches (64 mm) or 2.2 inches (56 mm).

All Bulldog models have a cylinder of five shots.

As of 2007, Charter Arms only offers its 14420, 74420 and 74421 versions. Charter's Police Undercover could be considered a Bulldog variant because it is produced with the same frame model but its caliber is different and it was built to resemble the Undercover by Charter.

Variant	Caliber	Length	Barrel length	Weight	Capacity	Grip	Hammer
Model 13520	.357 Magnum	6.7 inches (171 mm)	2.2 inches (56 mm)	21.8 oz (620 g)	5 Cyl	Full	Regular
Model 14420	.44 Special	7.2 inches (184 mm)	2.5 inches (64 mm)	21.8 oz (620 g)	5 Cyl	Full	Regular
Model 73520	.357 Magnum	6.7 inches (171 mm)	2.2 inches (56 mm)	20.1 oz (570 g)	5 Cyl	Full	Regular
Model 74420	.44 Special	7.2 inches (184 mm)	2.5 inches (64 mm)	20.1 oz (570 g)	5 Cyl	Full	Regular
Model 74421	.44 Special	7.2 inches (184 mm)	2.5 inches (64 mm)	21.8 oz (620 g)	5 Cyl	Full	Double action only

== Incidents ==
The Bulldog was used by the serial killer David Berkowitz aka "the .44 Caliber Killer" and the "Son of Sam" who was responsible for a series of attacks and murders in New York City during 1976–1977 (before he was caught due to an outstanding parking violation).

== Bibliography ==
- Chris McNab (17 October 2002). Atlas ilustrado de Armas de fuego (in Spanish). Susaeta Ediciones. ISBN 84-305-5801-2.
