= Ashani pistol =

IOF .32" pistol (Ashani)
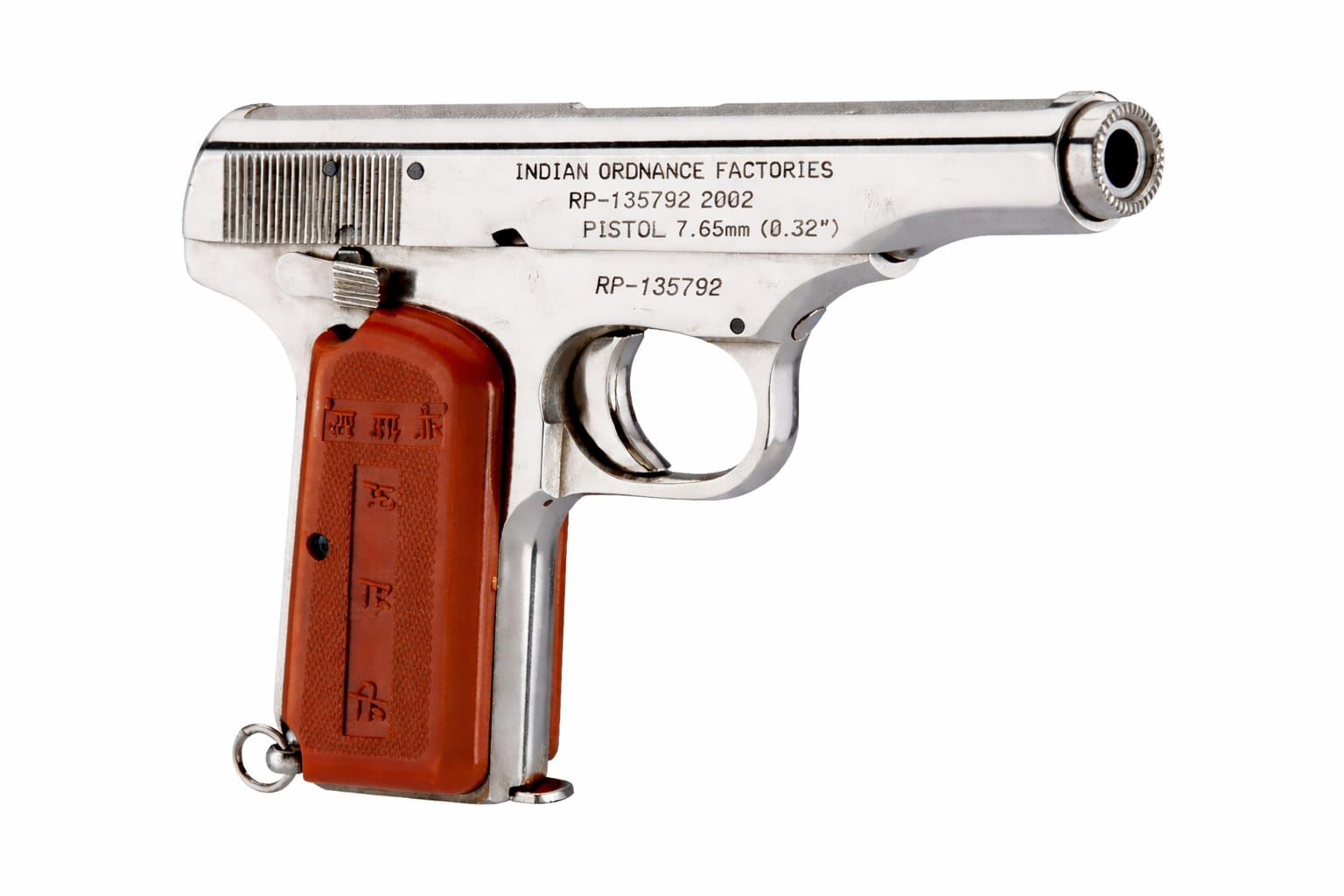
- IOF ishapore .32ACP Ashani pistol
- Type: Semi-automatic pistol
- Place of origin: India

Production history
- Manufacturer: Indian Ordnance Factory

Specifications
- Mass: 0.68 kg (1.5 lb)
- Length: 158 mm (6.2 in)
- Barrel length: 87.37 mm (3.440 in)
- Cartridge: .32 ACP
- Action: straight Blowback, Single action
- Feed system: 8-round detachable box magazine
- Sights: Fixed open sights

Ashani (also known as IOF .32 pistol) is a semi-automatic .32 calibre (7.65 mm) pistol designed and manufactured by the Ordnance Factory Board's Gun and Shell Factory and Rifle Factory Ishapore.

== Design ==
The IOF Ashani is based on the FN M1910 and operates on a straight Blowback mechanism. First produced in 1958, the pistol features a steel frame, an 8-round single-stack magazine, and fixed iron sights.

The Mk-II version, introduced in 2014, incorporates a polymer grip for improved ergonomics and a better finish. Weighing around 650 grams with a barrel length of 87.37mm, it offers an effective range of 25-30 meters and a muzzle velocity of approximately 290 m/s.

While it is compact and easy to maintain, the Ashani has drawbacks such as a heavy trigger pull, stiff slide operation, and relatively high cost compared to similar firearms.

== Usage ==
The IOF Ashani is designed primarily for civilian self-defense.

Despite its limitations, it remains a popular choice for licensed gun owners in India due to its availability and legal compliance.

== Variant ==
=== Ashani Mk I ===
The Mk I has a length of 158mm.

=== Ashani Mk II ===
The Mk II was officially launched on December 23, 2017. It has a length of 163mm.

It retails at 85,000 rupees (About US$1020).

== See also ==
- Nidar
- Nirbheek
- Indian Ordnance Factories .32 Revolver
- Indian Ordnance Factories .22 Revolver
