= .32 S&W Long =

American handgun cartridge

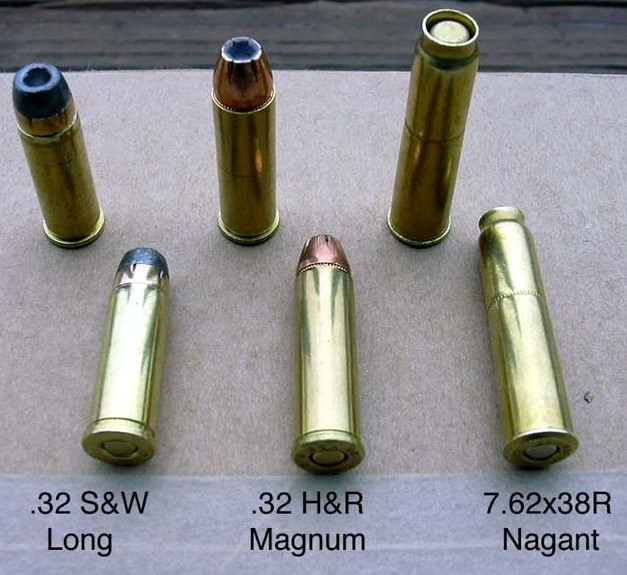
- .32 S&W Long (left) in comparison with .32 H&R Magnum and 7.62×38mmR Nagant
- Type: Revolver
- Place of origin: United States

Production history
- Designer: Smith & Wesson
- Designed: 1896
- Produced: 1896–Present

Specifications
- Parent case: .32 S&W
- Case type: Rimmed, straight
- Bullet diameter: .312 in (7.9 mm)
- Neck diameter: .337 in (8.6 mm)
- Base diameter: .337 in (8.6 mm)
- Rim diameter: .375 in (9.5 mm)
- Rim thickness: .055 in (1.4 mm)
- Case length: .920 in (23.4 mm)
- Overall length: 1.280 in (32.5 mm)
- Primer type: Small pistol
- Maximum pressure: 15,000 psi (100 MPa)

Ballistic performance
Bullet mass/type	Velocity	Energy
98 gr (6 g) LHBWC	718 ft/s (219 m/s)	112 ft⋅lbf (152 J)
90 gr (6 g) LSWC	765 ft/s (233 m/s)	117 ft⋅lbf (159 J)
85 gr (6 g) JHP	723 ft/s (220 m/s)	99 ft⋅lbf (134 J)

The .32 S&W Long / 7.65x23mmR, often called the .32 Long, is a straight-walled, centerfire, rimmed handgun cartridge, based on the earlier .32 S&W cartridge. It was introduced in 1896 for Smith & Wesson's first-model Hand Ejector revolver. Colt called it the .32 Colt New Police in revolvers it made chambered for the cartridge.

== History ==
The .32 S&W Long, a lengthened version of the earlier .32 S&W, was introduced in 1896 with the Smith & Wesson (S&W) .32 Hand Ejector revolver, which, with its swing-out cylinder, has been the basis for every S&W revolver designed since. In its original form, the cartridge was loaded with black powder. In 1903, the small Hand Ejector was slightly redesigned. The cartridge retained the same dimensions, but was now loaded with smokeless powder to roughly the same chamber pressure.

When he was the New York City Police Commissioner, Theodore Roosevelt standardized the department's use of the Colt New Police revolver. The cartridge was then adopted by several other northeastern U.S. police departments. The .32 Long is well known as an unusually accurate cartridge. This reputation led Police Commissioner Roosevelt to select it as an expedient way to increase officers' accuracy with their revolvers in New York City. The Colt company referred to the .32 S&W Long cartridge as the .32 "Colt's New Police" cartridge, concurrent with the conversion of the Colt New Police revolver from .32 Long Colt. The cartridges are functionally identical with the exception that the .32 NP cartridge has been historically loaded with a flat nosed bullet as opposed to the round nose of the .32 S&W Long.

== Current use ==
In the United States, it is usually older revolvers which are chambered in this caliber. The cartridge has mostly fallen out of use because similarly sized revolvers chambered in .38 Special are more effective for self-defense. The cartridge is widely used internationally, particularly in countries like India that restrict the calibers available to civilian firearms owners. Revolvers are still produced in this caliber in South America, South Asia, and Eastern Europe.

The .32 S&W Long is popular among international competitors in ISSF 25 meter center-fire pistol, using high-end target pistols from makers such as Pardini Arms, Morini, Hämmerli, Benelli, and Walther, among others, but chambered for wadcutter bullet type. The sporting variant of the Manurhin MR 73, also known as MR 32, is also chambered in .32 S&W Long.

The IOF .32 Revolver manufactured by the Ordnance Factories Organization in India for civilian licence holders is chambered for this cartridge.

== Interchangeability ==
The .32 S&W Long headspaces on the rim and shares the rim dimensions and case and bullet diameters of the shorter .32 S&W cartridge and the longer .32 H&R Magnum and .327 Federal Magnum cartridges. The shorter .32 S&W may be fired in handguns chambered for the .32 S&W Long; and the .32 S&W Long may be fired in arms chambered for the longer .32 H&R and .327 Federal magnums; although the longer cartridges should not fit and must not be fired in arms designed for the shorter and less powerful cartridges.

The .32 S&W Long and .32 Long Colt are not interchangeable. At one time it was widely publicized that these rounds would interchange, but in truth it has never been deemed safe to do so.

== Gallery ==
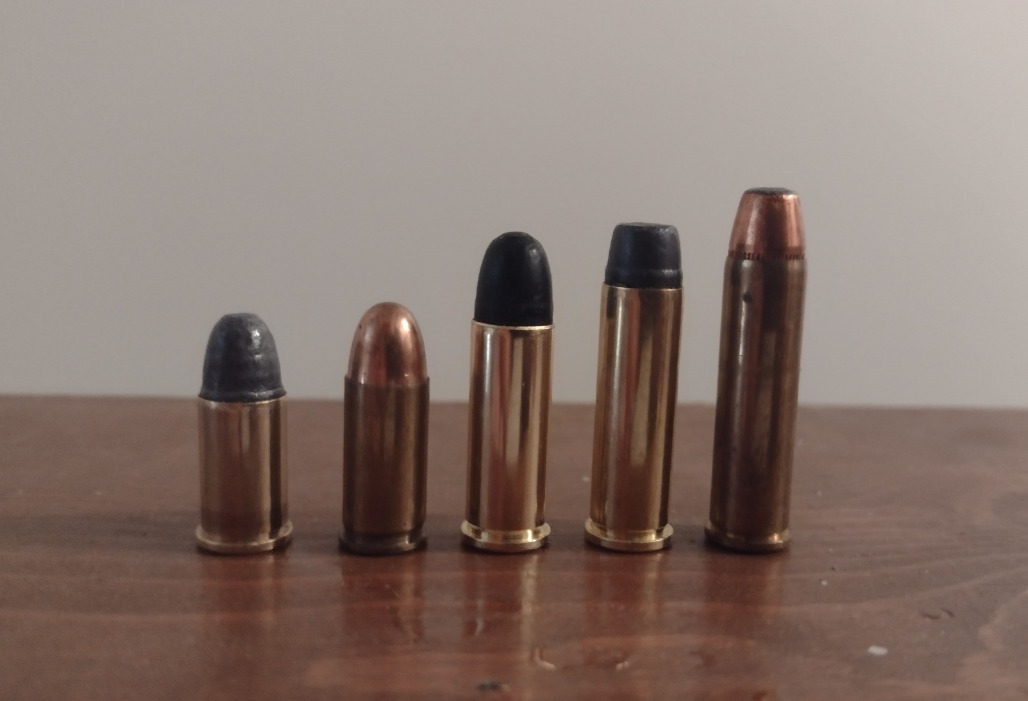
From left to right: .32 Short, .32 ACP, .32 S&W Long, .32 H&R Magnum and .327 Federal Magnum.

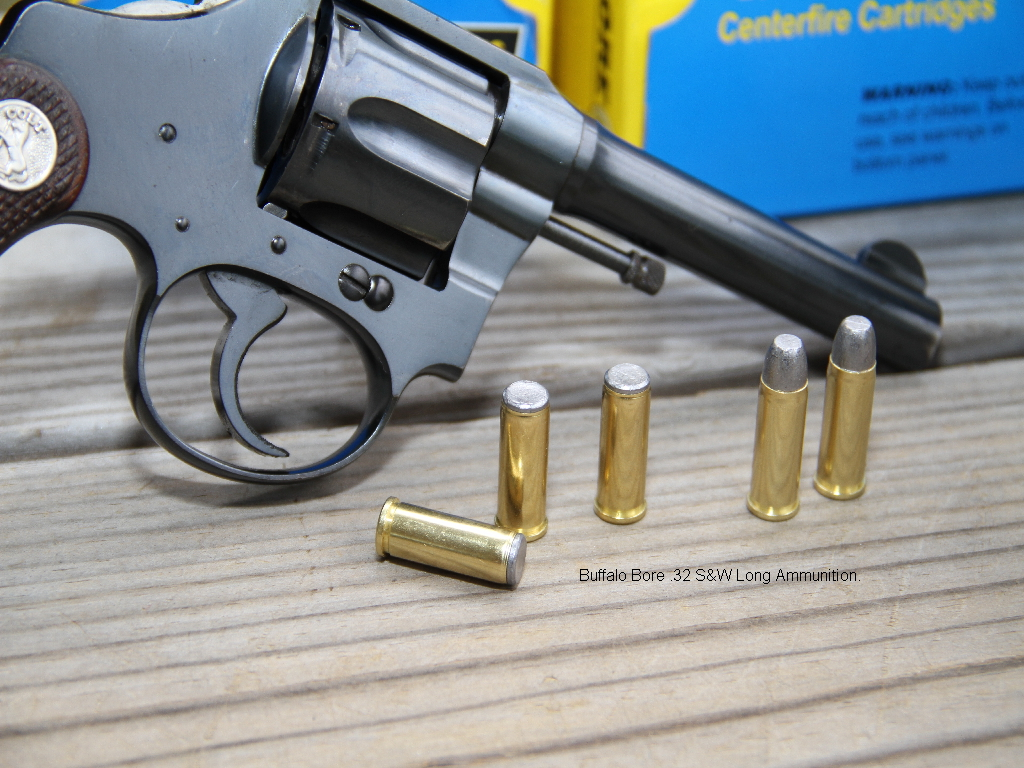
Modern high velocity loadings of the .32 S&W Long/Colt New Police

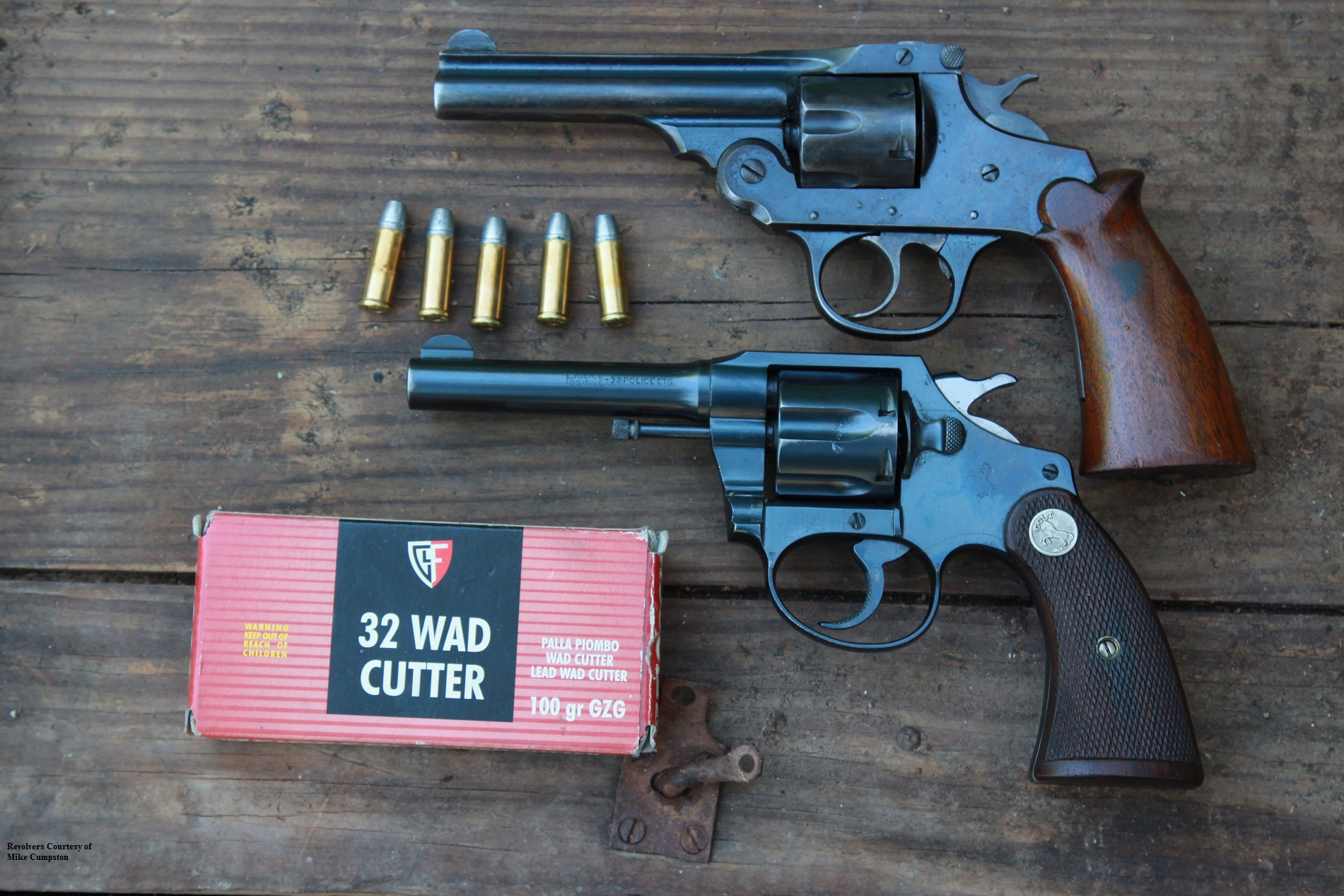
Above: Iver Johnson Safety Automatic; below: Colt Police Positive—both chambered for .32 Smith and Wesson Long/Colt New Police. ("Automatic" refers to automatic, simultaneous ejection of cartridges and/or cases.)

== See also ==
- 8 mm caliber
- .32 caliber
- List of rimmed cartridges
- List of handgun cartridges
- S&W Model 30
- Table of handgun and rifle cartridges
