= Hand ejector =

Revolver design

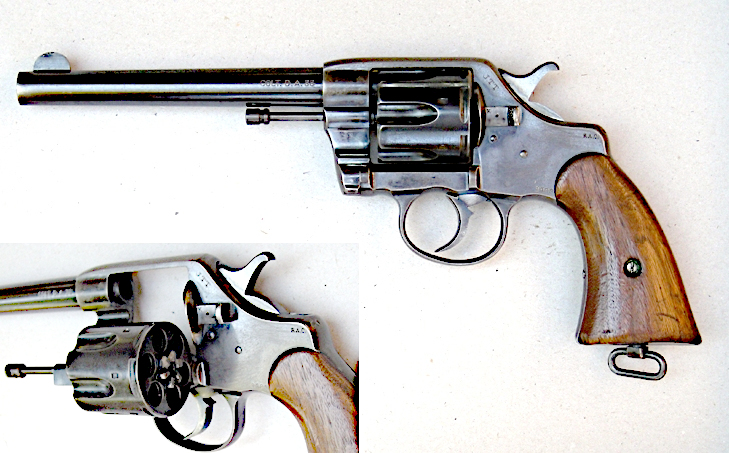
Colt New Army Model 1892 hand ejector revolver

A hand ejector is a revolver design that is used on most double-action revolvers to this day.

== Design ==
A hand ejector is characterized by a cylinder that swings out on a hinge (known as a crane) and requires the pushing of a concentric rod toward the cylinder to eject the spent cases from the cylinder. The term "hand ejector" (though not the design itself) was originated by Smith & Wesson to differentiate this class of revolver from the "top break" design, in which rotating the barrel together with the cylinder up and away from the gun's frame would "automatically" eject the cases.
