= Federal Premium Ammunition =

American ammunition manufacturer

- Formerly: Federal Cartridge Corporation
- Company type: Subsidiary
- Industry: Ammunition
- Founded: 1916 Refounding: April 27, 1922
- Headquarters: Anoka, Minnesota, U.S.
- Key people: Charles L. Horn (founder)
- Products: Shotshell, centerfire, rimfire ammunition
- Number of employees: 1,500
- Parent: Czechoslovak Group
- Website: www.federalpremium.com

Federal Premium Ammunition is a wholly owned subsidiary of the Czechoslovak Group, located in Anoka, Minnesota. With a workforce of nearly 1,500, Federal manufactures shotshell, centerfire, and rimfire ammunition and components.

== History ==
The original Federal Cartridge and Machine Company was founded during the period of increased ammunition demand during the First World War, by brothers Harry and Louis Sherman. Experienced in the industry, the two found investors to establish a small plant on the eastern outskirts of Anoka, Minnesota to make shotgun shells. Due to conflicts with investors, the brothers left the company in early 1917 for the American Cartridge Company; seven years later this firm was acquired by Federal. The end of the First World War led to factory's closure in 1920.

On April 27, 1922, Charles L. Horn took control of the plant and refounded Federal Cartridge Corporation. Horn launched a distribution plan that involved merchandising Federal products in grocery stores, barbershops, and filling stations.

In 1940 the British Purchasing Commission contracted 1.4 million mortar ignition cartridges (essentially a type of blank 12-gauge shotgun cartridge). In the next year, Federal won an $87 million contract from the United States government (approx. $1.3 billion in 2010) to build and operate the $30 million Twin City Ordnance Plant. Federal ranked 59th among United States corporations in the value of World War II military production.

In 1977, William B. Horn introduced Federal's Premium line of centerfire rifle and shotshell ammunition. Federal also owned Hoffman Engineering, a company that made electronic enclosures.

In 1985, Federal was sold to a group of private investors including Kelso & Company, BancBoston Capital, and members of the management team. The two companies were united under the name Federal-Hoffman, Inc and taken private during the sale.

In 1988, Pentair Inc., a diversified manufacturer based in Minnesota, agreed to acquire FC Holdings Inc., the holding company for Federal-Hoffman Inc., for $175 million in cash and the assumption of debt. Federal-Hoffman has since split, and Federal was owned by Vista Outdoor Inc.

In February 2015, Vista Outdoor, formerly a group of outdoor and sporting companies owned by Alliant Techsystems, was spun off from Alliant Techsystems. Federal Cartridge does business today as Federal Premium Ammunition.

In 2024, Vista Outdoor sold the company to the Czechoslovak Group.

== Products and marketing ==
Federal makes hundreds of types of ammunition for a wide variety of customers and uses.

In 2019, Federal started selling directly to consumers through its online store. This was partially prompted by Walmart's decision to stop selling certain calibers of ammunition. Federal also started a new service where customers can order hand-loaded ammunition customized for their needs.

=== Defense ammunition ===
==== HST 380 Auto Micro ====
The HST 380 Auto Micro was designed for self-defense and use in small pistols such as the Smith & Wesson Bodyguard. It has a nickel-plated casing and special primer that improve its reliability in semi-automatic handguns. It weighs 99 grains and has a deep, tapered hollow-point to provide consistent expansion. This ammunition does not meet the FBI Ammunition Testing Protocol. With a 3.75-inch test barrel, HST 380 Auto Micro ammunition achieves a muzzle velocity of 1,030 feet per second, a velocity of 990 feet per second at 25 yards, and a velocity of 950 feet per second at 50 yards. Using the same sized test barrel, it measures 235 foot-pounds of muzzle energy.

==== Hydra-Shok ====
Hydra-Shok is a type of cartridge with expanding bullets. It was originally patented by Federal Premium bullet designer Tom Burczynski. Hydra-Shok was introduced in 1988 after the FBI requested a bullet with better terminal ballistics than traditional cup and core projectiles.

Hydra-Shok ammunition has a patented center-post design and notched jacket with a non-bonded lead core. Hydra-Shok is designed to provide more reliable expansion and deeper penetration than other hollow-point projectiles used at that time. Federal Premium claims that the scored jacket and center post design provide a "programmed" expansion. There has been much debate regarding the bullets unreliable expansion when fired through clothing or media other than ballistic gelatin. In ballistic gelatin, the bullet typically displays very rapid expansion resulting in a larger but more shallow wound channel than would be typical from most other bullet configurations in the same caliber and of similar weight.

=== Vital-Shok ===
Federal Premium announced a .30-30 Winchester version of its Vital-Shok Trophy Copper ammunition for medium-sized game in August 2015. These bullets are tipped with polymer inserts to affect rapid expansion and retain 99 percent of their mass after expanding. The one percent loss of mass is due mostly to shedding the polymer tip. The case of this cartridge is nickel-plated to make extraction easier and prevent corrosion.

Federal Premium sells shotgun slugs with Vital-Shok branding. These slugs use the Foster, also known as American, design. Foster-type slugs have rifling to make it easier to pass them through a choke and have hollow tails that help stabilize the slug in flight.

=== .327 Federal Magnum ===
The .327 Federal Magnum is a cartridge introduced by Federal Cartridge intended to provide the power of a .357 Magnum in six shot, compact revolvers. The .327 has also been used in full-sized revolvers and Henry's Big Boy Steel carbine. The .327 Federal Magnum is actually a super magnum having replaced the .32 H&R Magnum as the pinnacle of power in this diameter revolver cartridge.

=== Shotgun shells ===
==== Black Cloud Snow Goose ====
Federal Black Cloud Snow Goose loads are designed for use against large waterfowl. It comes in BB and 2. Federal claims a muzzle velocity of 1,635 feet per second.

==== Shorty Shotshells ====
Shorty Shotshells are very short for shotgun ammunition as they have a length of only 1.75 inches. Federal says the Shortys work just as well as full-sized shotshells, although some pump-action and semi-auto shotguns may cycle them improperly without conversion parts. The Shorty Shotshell comes in #8 shot, #4 buck, or a rifled slug.

=== .224 Valkyrie ===
Federal significantly expanded the number of .224 Valkyrie loads it offers. The Varmint and Predator load hold 60-grain Hornady V-MAX bullets. The 80.5-grain Gold Medal Berger Match was designed for long-range target shooting. The 78-grain Barnes TSX copper hollow point is a hunting round for large game such as deer.

== American Eagle brand ==
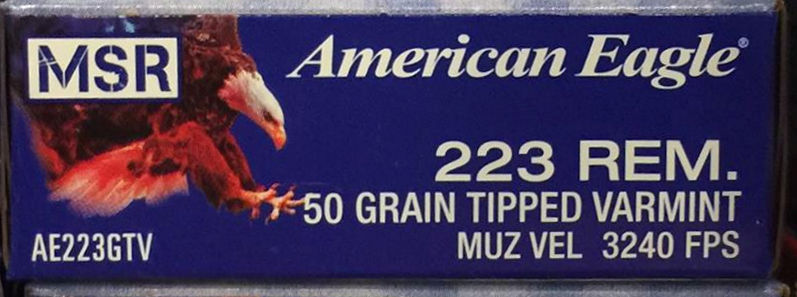
American Eagle Ammunition

=== Syntech ===
In late 2015, Federal Premium introduced Syntech ("synthetic technology") line of pistol bullets for the 9mm Luger, .40 S&W and .45 ACP calibers, under Federal's American Eagle brand. The "Syntech" trademark derives from the Total Polymer Jacket (TPJ), a synthetic low-friction polymer jacketing that replaces the traditional bare lead or copper jacketing. With no metal-on-metal contact with the bore and rifling, the polymer-jacketed bullets theoretically will impose much less wear on the rifling and generate less heat, which helps to extend barrel life as well as eliminate lead and copper fouling in the bore. Cartridges using Syntech bullets also use special primers and clean-burning propellants to further minimize carbon fouling.

Syntech was designed for indoor-range shooters. In addition to being cleaner than conventional ammunition, Federal Premium claims that Syntech is also safer due to decreased splash and fragmenting when hitting hard targets. The company says its studies show that what little spray there is stays close to the target.
