= Nidar (revolver) =

Ordnance Factories Board Nidar
- Type: Revolver
- Place of origin: India

Production history
- Manufacturer: Ordnance Factories Board
- Unit cost: 35,000 rupees ($513/£357)
- Produced: 2016

Specifications
- Mass: 250 g (8.8 oz)
- Length: 140 mm (5.5 in)
- Barrel length: 40.3 mm (1.59 in)
- Cartridge: .22 Long Rifle
- Caliber: .22 calibre
- Action: Double action/single action
- Muzzle velocity: 123 metres per second (400 ft/s)
- Effective firing range: 7 metres (7.7 yd)
- Feed system: 8-round cylinder
- Sights: Iron sights

The Ordnance Factories Board Nidar (lit. 'fearless') is a lightweight revolver manufactured by the Ordnance Factories Board of India.

== History ==
Like the earlier Nirbheek revolver, it was named for the victim of the 2012 Delhi gang rape, whom the Indian press nicknamed "Nirbhaya".

The revolver received 100 orders on the first day after its launch in 2016. The manufacturer stated that they expected to sell 10,000 revolvers.

== Design ==
The Nidar revolver is chambered for the .22 Long Rifle cartridge.

As the Nidar revolver is intended for concealed carry, it is made with an aluminium alloy to reduce the weight of the revolver.

According to a Rifle Factory Ishapore representative, the alloy is known as "DTD1524". It has a weight of 250 grams.

The revolver has a conventional double- or single-action trigger with a capacity of 8 rounds.

== See also ==
- Nirbheek
- Ashani pistol
- Indian Ordnance Factories .32 Revolver
- Indian Ordnance Factories .22 Revolver
