= Ruger SP101 =

SP101
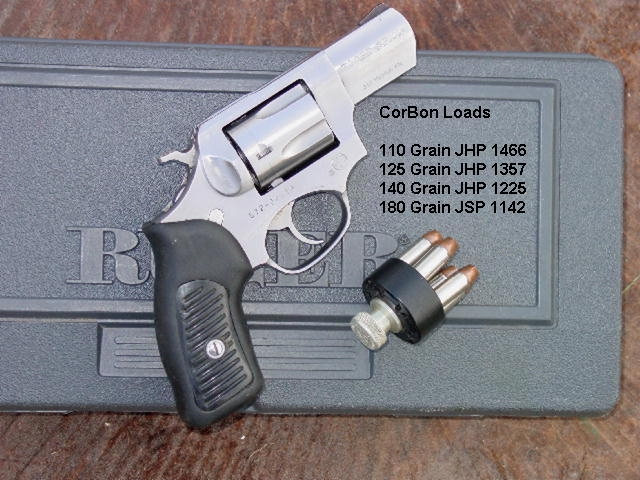
- SP101 with Corbon load data
- Type: Revolver
- Place of origin: United States

Production history
- Manufacturer: Sturm, Ruger & Co.
- Produced: 1989–2026
- Variants: See Models

Specifications
- Mass: 25–30 oz (710–850 g)
- Length: 7.2 in (18 cm); 8 in (20 cm); 9.12 in (23.2 cm)
- Barrel length: 2.25 in (5.7 cm); 3.06 in (7.8 cm); 4.2 in (11 cm)
- Cartridge: .22 LR.38 Special.357 Magnum.327 Federal Magnum; 9×19mm.32 H&R Magnum (discontinued)
- Action: Double-action revolver
- Effective firing range: 33 to 55 yards (30 to 50 meters)
- Maximum firing range: 550 yards (500 meters) +/−
- Feed system: 5/6/8-round cylinder

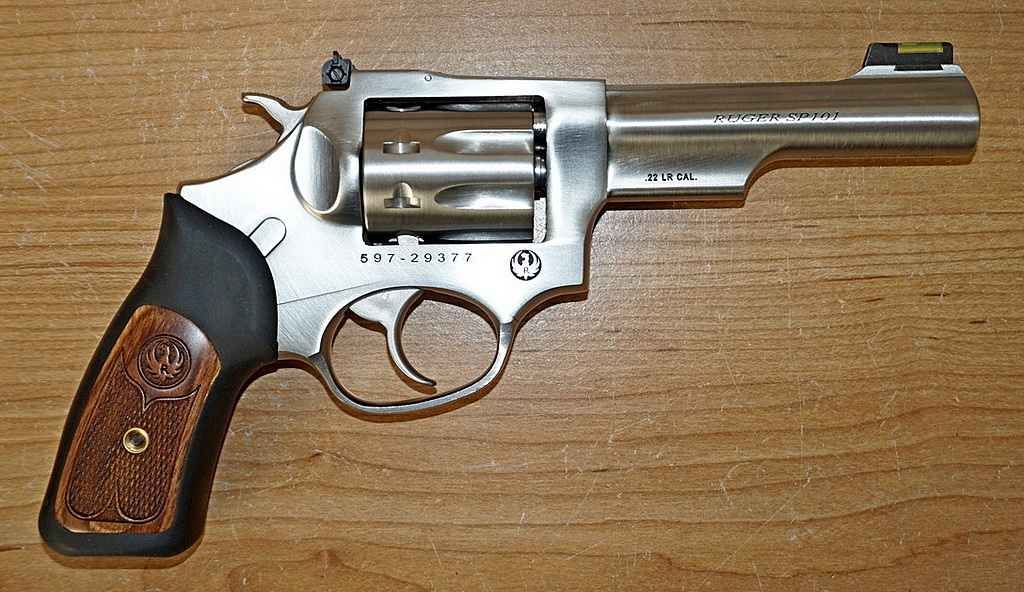
Ruger SP101 .22 LR, 8 shots, 4 1/5 inch barrel

The Ruger SP101 is a series of double-action revolvers produced by the American company Sturm, Ruger & Co. The SP101 is a small frame and all-steel-construction carry revolver, with a five-shot (.38 Special, .357 Magnum, and 9×19mm Parabellum); six-shot (.327 Federal Magnum and .32 H&R Magnum); or eight-shot (.22 LR) cylinder.

== History ==
The Ruger SP101 was introduced in 1989 as the smaller-frame counterpart to the GP100. Together, these revolvers replaced Sturm, Ruger & Co's long-standing staple in the American firearms market, the Ruger Security-Six series revolvers. A 9 mm version was available until its discontinuation around 1998 but was later re-released in early 2018. A basic .22 LR version was also available until 2003 while a redesigned version was introduced in 2011.

In October 2026, Ruger announced the discontinuation of the SP101, along with several other firearms to focus on models like the RXM and Security-9 handguns, and Mini-14 and 10/22 rifles.

== Features and description ==
- The SP101 is no longer manufactured in .327 Federal Magnum, .357 Magnum, 9 mm, .38 Special, and .22 LR. production ceased 10/
- Barrel lengths 2 1/4" (57.15mm), 3 1/16" (77.79mm), and 4 1/5" (106.7mm) with full underlugs. 4" (101.6mm) and 4 1/5" (106.7mm) with half underlug.
- Stainless steel construction
- Transfer bar safety mechanism
  - Firing pin mounted in frame
  - The transfer bar in the SP101 is connected directly to the trigger
- Fixed (all calibers) or adjustable (.327 Federal Magnum, .357 Magnum, and .22 LR) sights
- Spurred or spurless (double-action only) hammer

== Specifications ==
- Weight:
  - 2 1/4", 25 1/2 oz. (708 g)
  - 3 1/16", 27 oz. (765 g)
  - 4 1/5", 22 LR: 30 oz. (850 g), .327 Federal Magnum: 29.5 oz (836 g), and .357 Magnum: 29.5 oz.(836 g)
- Barrel lengths: 2 1/4" (57.15 mm), 3 1/16" (77.79 mm), 4" (101.6mm)
- Double-action/single-action
  - Double-action-only on select models
- Five-shot (.38 Special, .357 Magnum, 9×19mm Parabellum), six-shot (.327 Federal Magnum, .32 H&R Magnum), eight-shot (.22 LR)
- Maximum effective range: 33 to 55 yards (30 to 50 meters) depending on barrel length and cartridge load

== Models ==
Catalog number	Caliber	Capacity	Sights	Shroud	Barrel length	Weight	Notes
KSP-221	.22 LR	6	Adj.	Full	2 1/4"	32 oz	Discontinued
KSP-240	.22 LR	6	Adj.	Short	4"	33 oz	Discontinued
KSP-241	.22 LR	6	Adj.	Full	4"	34 oz	Discontinued
KSP-242-8	.22 LR	8	Adj.	Short	4 1/5"	30 oz	Adjustable fiberoptic
KSP-3231	.32 H&R Magnum	6	Adj.	Full	3 1/16"	30 oz	Discontinued
KSP-3241	.32 H&R Magnum	6	Adj.	Full	4"	33 oz	Discontinued
KSP-32731X	.327 Federal Magnum	6	Adj.	Full	3 1/16"	28 oz	No longer on web site: Jan 16, 2013
KSP-32741	.327 Federal Magnum	6	Adj.	Full	4 1/5"	29.5 oz	
KSP-821	.38 Special +P	5	Fixed	Full	2 1/4"	25 oz	
KSP-821DOS	.38 Special +P	5	Fixed	Full	2 1/4"	25 oz	Bobbed hammer made for the U.S. State Department
KSP-831	.38 Special +P	5	Fixed	Full	3 1/16"	27 oz	Discontinued
KSP-321X	.357 Magnum	5	Fixed	Full	2 1/4"	26 oz	
KSP-341X	.357 Magnum	5	Adj.	Full	4 1/5"	29.5 oz	Adjustable fiberoptic
KSP-321X-CT	.357 Magnum	5	Fixed	Full	2 1/4"	25 oz	Crimson Trace lasergrips
KSP-321XL-LG	.357 Magnum	5	Fixed	Full	2 1/4"	25 oz	Crimson Trace lasergrips
KSP-331X	.357 Magnum	5	Fixed	Full	3 1/16"	27 oz	
KSP-321XL	.357 Magnum	5	Fixed	Full	2 1/4"	25 oz	D.A.O
KSP-921	9×19mm Parabellum	5	Fixed	Full	2 1/4"	26 oz	Discontinued, uses moon clips; re-introduced November 2017
KSP-931	9×19mm Parabellum	5	Fixed	Full	3 1/16"	27 oz	Discontinued, uses moon clips

- All models are made of stainless steel
- Caliber: .357 Magnum SP101s handle all .357 Magnum factory loads and accept factory .38 Special cartridges
- Spurless-hammer models (double-action only) are designated by an "L" in their catalog numbers

== Users ==
- United States
  - New York Police Department SPNY Double Action Only (DAO) .38 Special made specifically for the NYPD as a backup gun, off-duty, or Detective use.
