= Ruger GP100 =

GP100
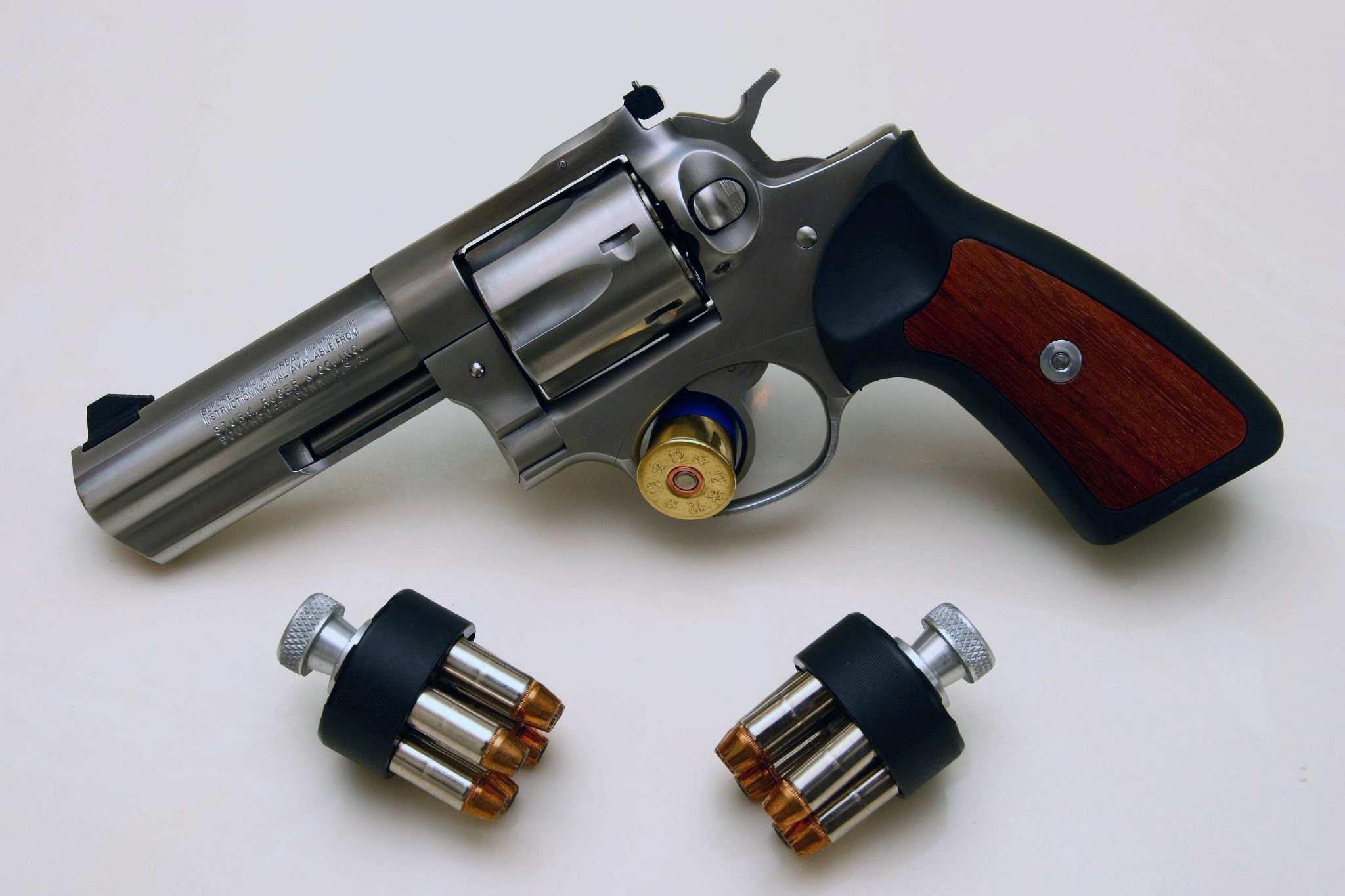
- Ruger KGP-141 with speed loaders of .357 ammunition.
- Type: Revolver
- Place of origin: United States

Production history
- Manufacturer: Sturm, Ruger & Co.
- Produced: 1985–2026
- No. built: 734,500
- Variants: See Models

Specifications
- Mass: 35–45 oz (990–1,280 g)
- Length: 8–11.5 inches (200–290 mm)
- Barrel length: 2.5 in (64 mm); 3 in (76 mm); 4 in (100 mm); 4.2 in (110 mm); 5 in (130 mm); 6 in (150 mm)
- Cartridge: 10mm Auto; .22 long rifle; .327 Federal Magnum; .357 Magnum; .38 Special; .44 Special
- Action: Double-action revolver
- Effective firing range: 55–110 yards (50–101 m)
- Maximum firing range: +/− 550 yards (500 m)
- Feed system: 5-shot cylinder (.44 Special); 6-shot cylinder (.357 Magnum, .38 Special, and 10mm Auto); 7-shot cylinder (.357 Magnum & .327 Federal Magnum); 10-shot cylinder (.22 Long Rifle)

The GP100 is a family/line of double action five- (.44 Special), six- (.357 Magnum, .38 Special, and 10mm Auto), seven- (.357 Magnum and .327 Federal Magnum), or ten-shot (.22 long rifle) revolvers made by Sturm, Ruger & Co., manufactured in the United States.

== History ==
The GP100 was an evolution of an earlier Ruger double-action revolver, the Security Six.

It was introduced in 1985 as a second generation of the Ruger double-action, exposed-hammer revolvers intended to replace Ruger's Security-/Service-/Speed-Six line.

It was made stronger with the intent to fire an unlimited number of full-power .357 Magnum rounds. The first significant change was introduced with the Ruger Redhawk and that involved a new triple-locking cylinder mechanism with a lever on the crane rather than using the end of the ejector rod to lock.

Another change was the use of stronger steels and the redesigned, beefier shape of the frame.

Traditional revolver frames had exposed metal at the front and rear of the grips, with the frame determining the shape of the grips. This meant that to have a round butt concealed carry version and a square butt holster or target version of the same gun usually meant having two different frame shapes.

The GP100 series, instead, used a small rectangular "peg" grip large enough to enclose the hammer spring and strut. The grips could then be any shape desired, as long as they were large enough to enclose the peg.

This was not an innovation, having been used by Dan Wesson and some High Standard revolvers that predated the GP100.

The Dan Wesson patent (U.S. patent 3,683,535) was granted in 1972 and Ruger's patent (U.S. patent 4,625,445) was granted in 1986.

In October 2026, Ruger announced the discontinuation of the GP100, along with several other firearms to focus on models like the RXM and Security-9 handguns, and Mini-14 and 10/22 rifles.

== Features ==
=== Grips ===
The stock grips are made of Santoprene, a soft, chemical resistant elastomer that helps absorb the recoil of firing.

Panels on the side, made of black plastic, gonçalo alves wood, or rosewood, provide contrast to the flat black of the Santoprene.

The grips are now Hogue one piece rubber grips standard.

=== Frame ===
The GP100 shares the crane lock from the Redhawk that was later used in the small frame SP101 revolver.

All of these models use the same thickness on the solid frame and double latching system as used on the heavy .44 Magnum.

Because of these features, the GP100 series is widely described as one of the strongest medium frame revolvers ever made.

=== Ammunition ===
The GP100 is manufactured in .327 Federal Magnum, .357 Magnum, .38 Special, .22 long rifle, .44 Special, and 10mm Auto calibers. Available barrel lengths are 2.5 inches (64 mm), 3 inches (76 mm), 4 inches (100 mm), 4.2 inches (110 mm), 5 inches (130 mm), and 6 inches (150 mm) with partial or full length underlugs.

Blued steel or stainless steel finishes are available, with stainless model numbers preceded by a "K".

=== Safety ===
The firing pin of the GP100 is mounted inside the frame. The transfer bar of the GP100 is connected directly to the trigger. The transfer bar must be present between the hammer and the firing pin in order for the cartridge to be fired.

The transfer bar only assumes the required position when the trigger is pulled completely rearward.

=== Sights ===
GP100 models are available with fixed or adjustable sights. Fixed sight models are designated by a "F" suffix model number.

=== Cylinder ===
When the cylinder is closed and the gun is at the point of firing, the cylinder crane is locked into the frame at the front and rear of the crane and by the cylinder lock at the bottom of the crane opening.

=== Disassembly ===
The GP100 disassembles into three major modules with only limited use of tools. This allows the user to easily clean the revolver after shooting. The design of the gun eliminates the need for a frame "sideplate", a feature which contributes to the GP100's reputation for strength.

== Specifications ==
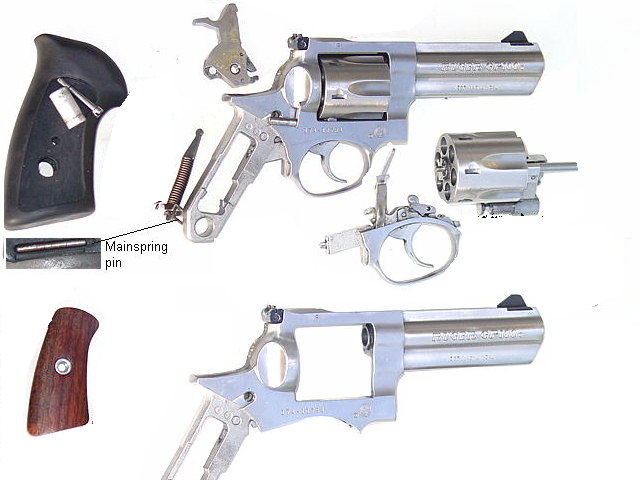
Major sub units of GP100 (KGP-141)

- Weight: Variable, dependent on barrel and shroud length
- Barrel lengths: 2.5 inches (64 mm), 3 inches (76 mm), 4 inches (100 mm), 4.2 inches (110 mm), 5 inches (130 mm), and 6 inches (150 mm), the run of 5" GP100 revolvers was made for the distributor, Davidson's.
- Action: The GP100 may be fired by either cocking the hammer and subsequently pulling the trigger (single action), or by merely pulling the trigger when the hammer is not cocked (double action)
- Maximum effective range: 55–110 yards (50–101 m), depending on barrel length, cartridge load, and additional optical sights
- 5-shot: .44 Special
- 6-shot: .357 Magnum, .38 Special, and 10mm Auto
- 7-shot: .357 Magnum and .327 Federal Magnum
- 10-shot: .22 long rifle

== Models ==
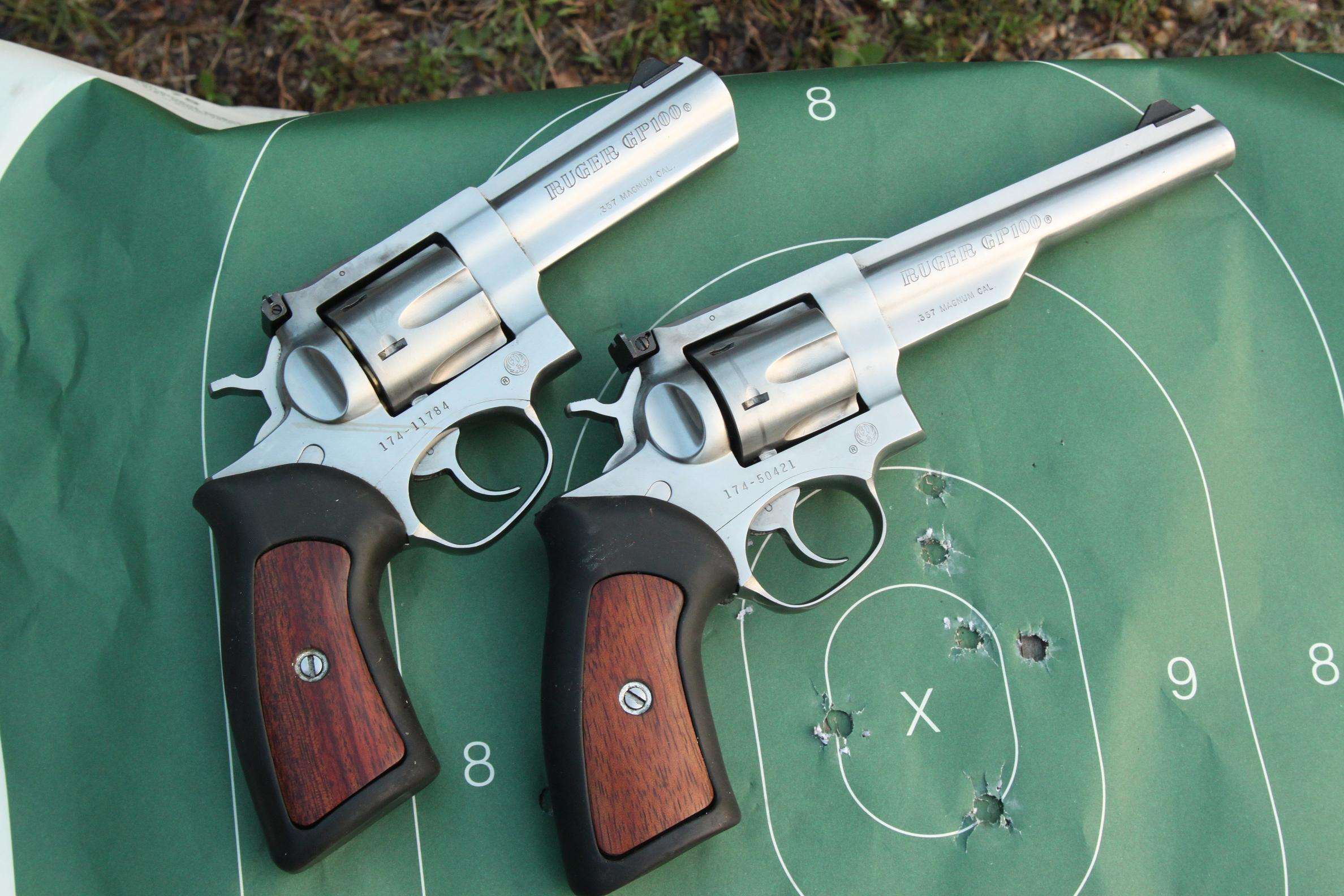
KGP-141 and KGP-160 .357 Magnum revolvers

Since its introduction, it has been produced with a number of variations including various barrel lengths and profiles, fixed or adjustable sights, and in blued carbon steel or stainless steel.

Catalog number	Caliber	Barrel Length	Finish	Sights	Weight	Shroud
GP-141	.357 Mag.	4"	Blued	Adjustable	41 oz	Full
GP-160	.357 Mag.	6"	Blued	Adjustable	43 oz	Short
GP-161	.357 Mag.	6"	Blued	Adjustable	46 oz	Full
GPF-331	.357 Mag.	3"	Blued	Fixed	36 oz	Full
GPF-340	.357 Mag.	4"	Blued	Fixed	37 oz	Short
GPF-341	.357 Mag.	4"	Blued	Fixed	38 oz	Full
KGP-141	.357 Mag.	4.2"	Stainless	Adjustable	41 oz	Full
KGP-151	.357 Mag.	5"	Stainless	Adjustable	42 oz	Full
KGP-160	.357 Mag.	6"	Stainless	Adjustable	43 oz	Short
KGP-161	.357 Mag.	6"	Stainless	Adjustable	46 oz	Full
KGPF-330	.357 Mag.	3"	Stainless	Fixed	35 oz	Short
KGPF-331	.357 Mag.	3"	Stainless	Fixed	36 oz	Full
KGPF-340	.357 Mag.	4"	Stainless	Fixed	37 oz	Short
KGPF-341	.357 Mag.	4"	Stainless	Fixed	38 oz	Full
KGPF-840	.38 Spl.	4"	Blued	Fixed	37 oz	Short
KGPF-841	.38 Spl.	4"	Blued	Fixed	38 oz	Full
GPNY	.38 Spl.	3" & 4"	Stainless	Fixed	36~37 oz	Full
KGP-4327-7	.327 Fed. Mag.	4.2"	Satin Stainless	Adjustable	40 oz	Full
1757	.22 LR.	5.5"	Satin Stainless	Adjustable	42 oz	Short
1761	.44 Spl.	3"	Satin Stainless	Adjustable	36 oz	Full
1790	.357 Mag	2.5"	Blued	Adjustable	35 oz	Full

== Special editions ==
In 2016, a limited edition variant of the GP100 was available from the Friends of NRA through a fundraising raffle.

The guns were all stainless, chambered in .357 Magnum, had 4 inch barrels, serial numbers with "NRA" prefixes, and rosewood grip inserts engraved with "NRA". Only 1,145 were produced.

In 2021, Ruger produced 500 GP100s in memory of Jeff Quinn, a YouTuber and founder of the online firearms magazine Gunblast, who died the previous year.

== Users ==
- Canada: Local police
- Greece: EKAM counter-terrorist unit of the Hellenic Police
- Serbia: Special Anti-Terrorist Unit
- USA: New York Police Department "GPNY"

== Gallery ==
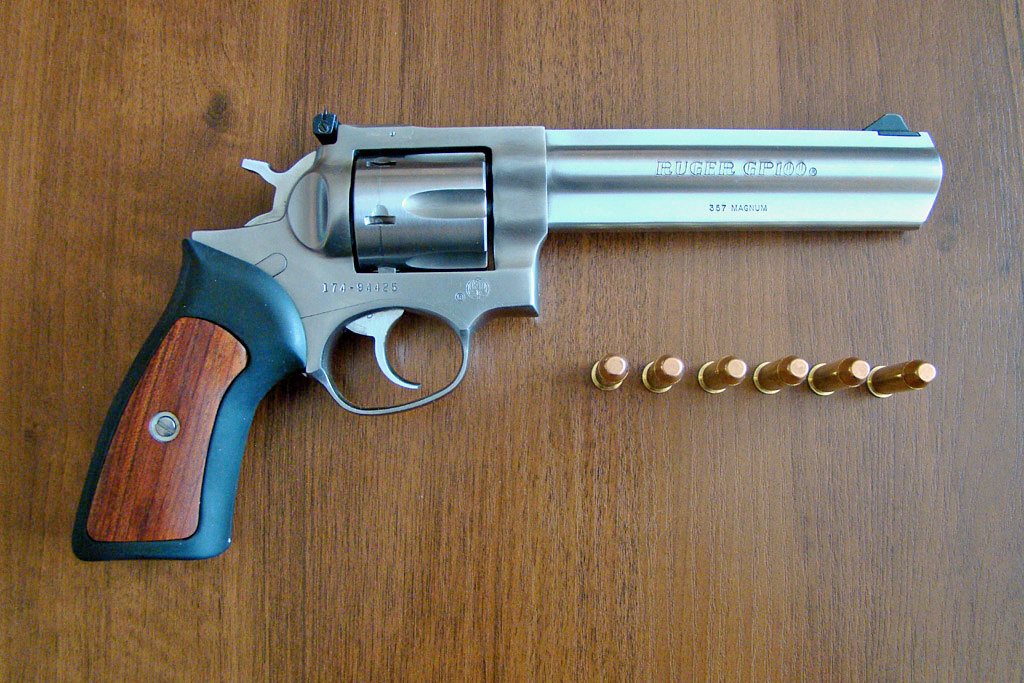
GP100 (mod. KGP-161) revolver

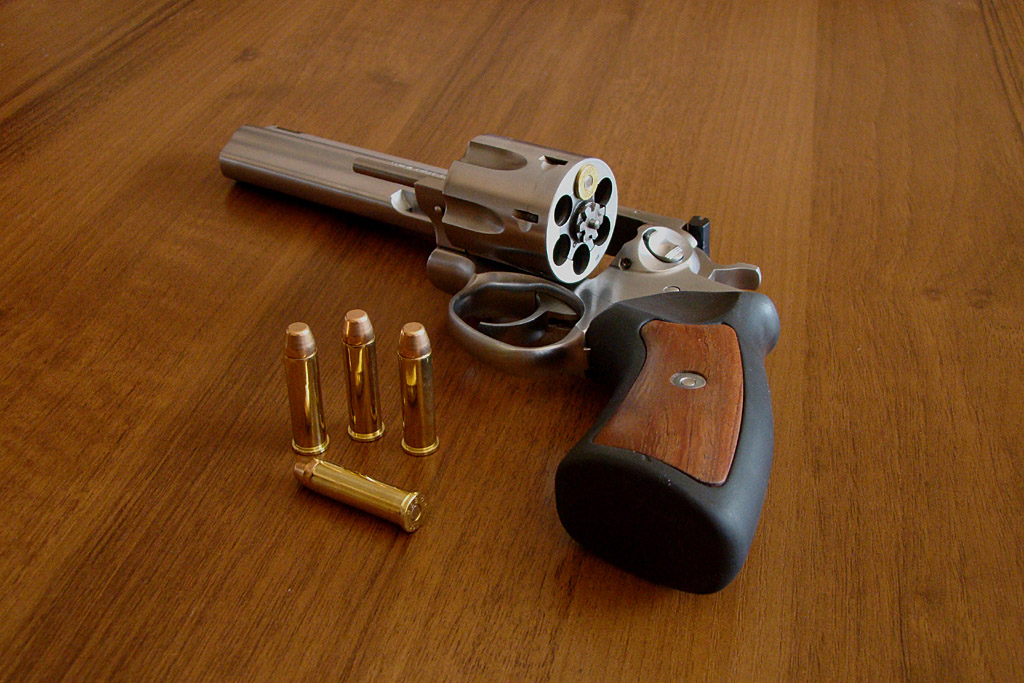
GP100 (KGP-161) with opened cylinder and .357 Magnum ammunition

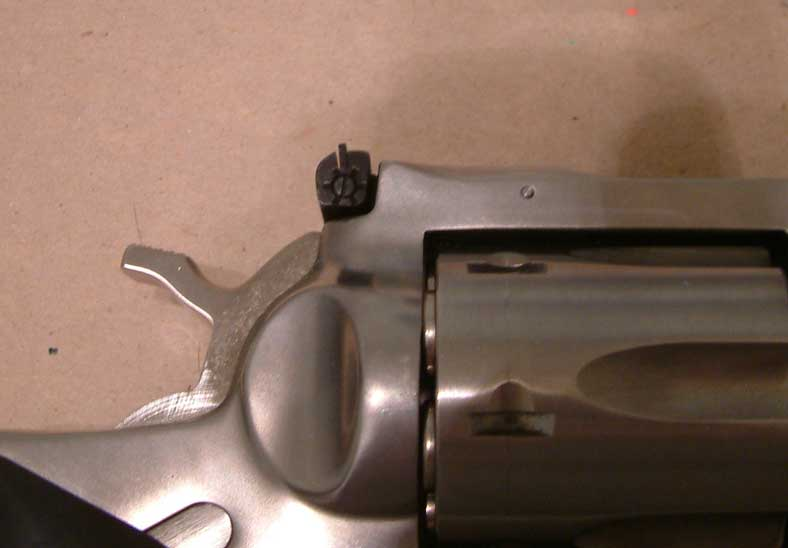
Ruger GP100 revolver adjustable rear sight
