= .327 Federal Magnum =

US revolver cartridge

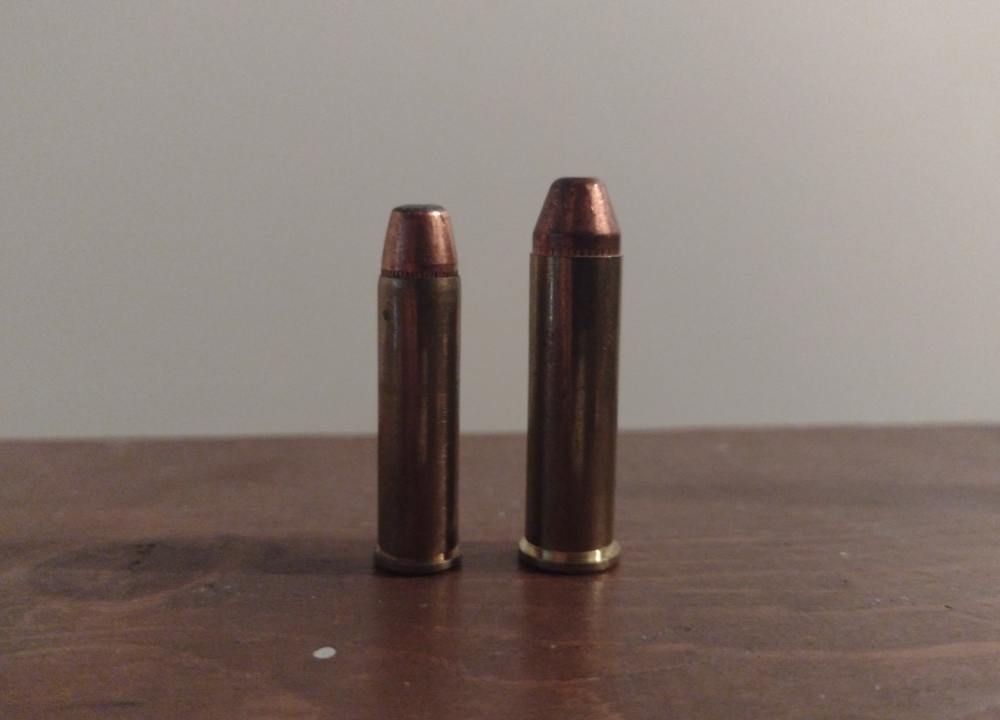
- .327 Federal Magnum (left) with a .357 Magnum (right)
- Type: Revolver
- Place of origin: United States

Production history
- Designer: Federal Premium Ammunition and Sturm, Ruger & Co.
- Designed: 2007
- Produced: 2008–present

Specifications
- Parent case: .32 H&R Magnum
- Case type: Rimmed, straight
- Bullet diameter: .312 in (7.9 mm)
- Neck diameter: .337 in (8.6 mm)
- Base diameter: .337 in (8.6 mm)
- Rim diameter: .375 in (9.5 mm)
- Rim thickness: .055 in (1.4 mm)
- Case length: 1.20 in (30 mm)
- Overall length: 1.47 in (37 mm)
- Primer type: Small pistol magnum
- Maximum pressure: 45,000 psi (310 MPa)

Ballistic performance
Bullet mass/type	Velocity	Energy
100 gr (6 g) JHP	1,400 ft/s (430 m/s)	435 ft⋅lbf (590 J)
115 gr (7 g) JHP	1,300 ft/s (400 m/s)	431 ft⋅lbf (584 J)
100 gr (6 g) JHP*	1,655 ft/s (504 m/s)	640 ft⋅lbf (870 J)
115 gr (7 g) JHP*	1,587 ft/s (484 m/s)	620 ft⋅lbf (840 J)
- Test barrel length: 3 1/16 in, * 5 1/2" Blackhawk Revolver; Source: Outdoor Writers * Ballistics by the inch

The .327 Federal Magnum (7.65×30mmR) is a cartridge introduced by Federal Premium Ammunition and also sold by Sturm, Ruger & Co. It is intended to provide the power of a .357 Magnum in six-shot, compact revolvers, whose cylinders would otherwise only hold five rounds. The .327 has also been used in full-sized revolvers with a capacity of seven rounds or more. The .327 Federal Mag is an example of a "super magnum", because it is a magnum of a magnum, the .32 H&R Magnum.

== Development ==
Introduced by the Federal Cartridge company, now known as Federal Premium Ammunition, the .327 Federal Magnum was an attempt to improve on the .32 H&R Magnum introduced in 1984. Like the .32 H&R, the .327 Federal is a lengthened version of the original .32 S&W cartridge, which dates back to 1878. In 1896, the .32 S&W Long was introduced, which generated slightly higher velocities. The introduction of the .32 H&R increased pressures from 15,000 psi (100 MPa) to 21,000 CUP, giving velocities of approximately 1,200 ft/s (370 m/s).

Based on the .32 H&R Magnum, with a .125 in (3.2 mm) longer case, a strengthened web at the base of the case, thicker case walls, and different heat-treatment and metallurgy, the .327 Federal can be loaded to much higher pressure levels (45,000 psi (310 MPa)) than its predecessor (21,000 CUP). The .327's actual bullet diameter is .312 in (7.92 mm), and it achieves muzzle velocities up to 1,400 ft/s (430 m/s) with 100 gr (6.5 g; 0.23 oz) bullets, and up to 1,300 ft/s (400 m/s) with 115 gr (7.5 g; 0.26 oz) bullets, when fired from the 3.0625 in (77.79 mm) (78 mm)-barreled Ruger SP101 revolver.

While perceived recoil exceeds that of the .32 H&R, revolvers in .327 Federal are much easier to control than equivalent models chambered in .357 Magnum. Comparing the two calibers, Chuck Hawks says, "There is no doubt that, for most shooters, the .357 Magnum produces uncomfortable recoil and muzzle blast."

The .327's recoil energy is 3.08 ft⋅lbf (4.18 J) for an 85 gr (5.5 g; 0.19 oz) jacketed hollowpoint (JHP) load, 5.62 ft⋅lbf (7.62 J) for the 115 gr (7.5 g; 0.26 oz) JHP, and 5.58 ft⋅lbf (7.57 J) for the 100 gr (6.5 g; 0.23 oz) softpoint (SP). For comparison, the figures are 1.46 ft⋅lbf (1.98 J) for an 85 gr (5.5 g; 0.19 oz) .32 H&R Magnum load and 7.22 ft⋅lbf (9.79 J) for a 125 gr (8.1 g; 0.29 oz) .357 Magnum load.

== Firearms chambered for the .327 Federal Magnum ==
Revolvers in .327 Federal Magnum were initially offered by Charter Arms, Taurus, Ruger, and Freedom Arms, with Ruger's SP101 originally selected as the development platform for the new cartridge. Freedom Arms made a single-action design, as did U.S. Fire Arms with its eight-shot Sparrowhawk. Ruger offered the double-action six-shot SP101 and seven-shot GP100, and the full-sized single-action eight-shot Blackhawk chambered in the caliber. A version of the Ruger SP101 with a 3.0625 in (77.79 mm) barrel was released in January 2008.

In late 2014, Ruger introduced the smaller-framed Ruger Single-Seven, a seven-shot single-action revolver based on the Single-Six. In March 2015, Ruger re-introduced the SP101 in .327 Federal Magnum, featuring fully adjustable sights and a longer, 4.2 inches (110 mm) barrel. In September 2015, Ruger also introduced the LCR, a double-action only, six-shot revolver with a polymer subframe, as well as the later LCRx.

In early 2017, Henry Repeating Arms announced production of four new lever-action long guns (a rifle and a carbine, each available with its receiver manufactured from either steel or hardened brass), with shipping scheduled to begin in March. Hawks suggests that lever-action carbines in .327 Magnum will make "excellent, fun-to-shoot centerfire rifles for hunting javelina, jackrabbit, and coyote." He also notes that revolvers with six-to-eight-inch barrels and adjustable sights "would be excellent hunting handguns for varmints and small predators, as well as offering flat-shooting protection from two-legged predators in the field."

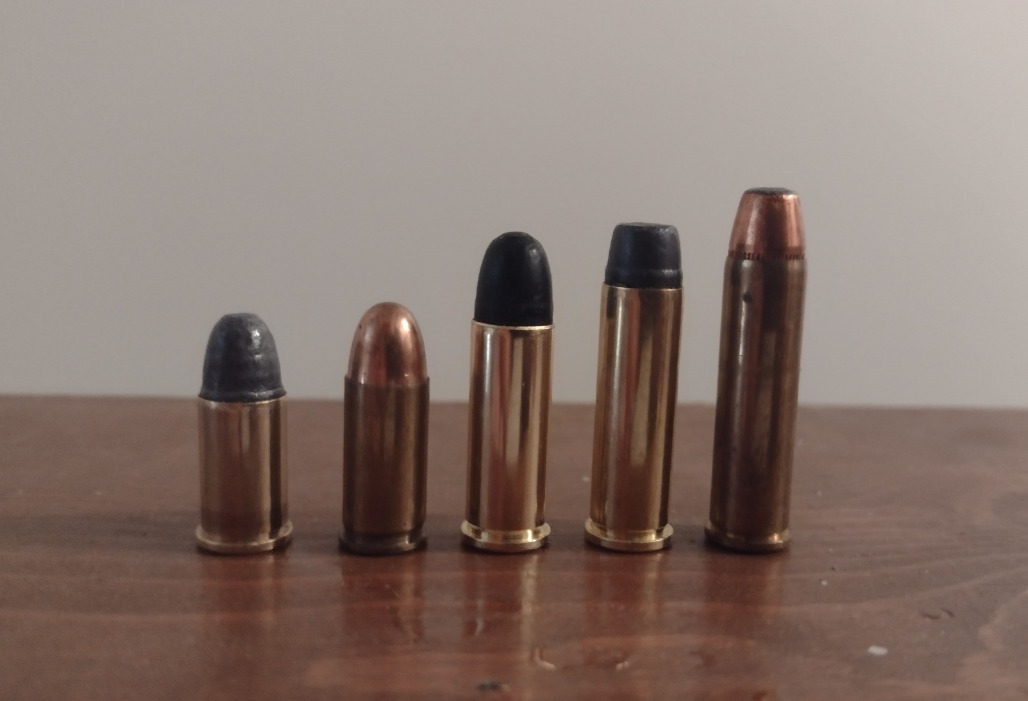
From left to right: .32 Short, .32 ACP, .32 S&W Long, .32 H&R Magnum and .327 Federal Magnum

In early 2022, Taurus released the Taurus 327 small frame revolver.

== Similar cartridges ==
The .327 Federal Magnum provides performance similar to the high-velocity rifle loadings of the old .32-20 Winchester, though these velocities are achieved in a much shorter revolver barrel, thanks to a much higher pressure ceiling for the .327 Federal Magnum.

Another similar cartridge is the .30 Carbine, which has been offered in Ruger's single-action Blackhawk revolver line since 1968. However, the .327 Federal Magnum has a higher maximum pressure (45,000 psi (310 MPa)) than the .30 Carbine (40,000 psi (280 MPa)).

Gunsmiths working with Ruger and Freedom Arms have offered custom conversions of single-action .32 H&R Single Six and Freedom Arms revolvers to .327 Federal Magnum. Test results from the long barreled guns showed even higher velocities than the .30 Carbine, along with excellent accuracy.

== See also ==
- .30 Super Carry
- 8 mm caliber
- List of handgun cartridges
- Super magnum
- Table of handgun and rifle cartridges
