= Nirbheek =

Six-shot cylinder revolver

Indian Ordnance Factories Nirbheek
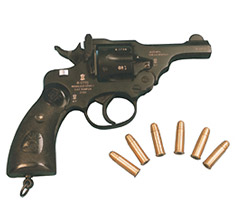
- Nirbheek revolver & 6 bullets
- Type: Revolver
- Place of origin: India

Production history
- Manufacturer: Indian Ordnance Factories via Field Gun Factory, Kanpur
- Unit cost: INR 122,360
- Produced: January 6, 2014–present
- No. built: 10 (January 2014); 28 (2015); 3,000 (2018); 2,500 (2019)

Specifications
- Mass: 525 g (19 oz)
- Length: 177.8 mm (7 in)
- Barrel length: 76.2 mm (3 in)
- Cartridge: .32 S&W Long (7.65×23mm)
- Action: Double-action revolver, break action
- Effective firing range: 50 m (164 ft)
- Feed system: 6-shot Cylinder
- Sights: Front sight–blade, rear sight-‘U’

Nirbheek (lit. "fearless") is a six-shot cylinder double-action revolver designed and manufactured by the Ordnance Factories Organization in Kanpur, India.

== Namesake ==
The Nirbheek is marketed as India's first gun for women and it is named after Nirbhaya, the alias given to a 23-year-old woman who was gang raped in Delhi on December 16, 2012, later dying of her injuries.

== History ==
In 2014, it was reported that 100 women made bookings to purchase the revolver.

In 2015, it was reported that men were the majority of buyers of the Nirbheek.

In 2016, buyers from Punjab lined up to purchase the Nirbheek.

== Design ==
The Nirbheek revolver is black, slim and lightweight, with a titanium-alloy body and wooden grips. It weighs 0.5 kg and it is said it could be carried in a purse or bag.

The simple mechanism is thought to have been based on earlier designs by Webley & Scott and Smith & Wesson. While the Nirbheek has a range of 10 meters, it is effective to be used at 15 meters.

== Criticism ==
The weapon attracted widespread criticism from women's groups and gun control advocates. They said that the "revolver for women" was an insult to the memory of Nirbhaya, the victim, and it could not be the solution to violence against women.

One gun control advocacy group said that they saw the launch of this gun by a state-owned factory as an admission of failure by the government. They claimed that women carrying guns are twelve times more likely to be shot by attackers compared to unarmed women.

The factory's general manager said that the gun would increase women's confidence and deter attackers. Critics say that not many women could afford the gun to defend themselves since it costs more than the average Indian's annual salary. Only high and middle-class women would be able to afford it but since these groups are not the most vulnerable (most of them use their own vehicle and do not need public transport), them having guns would not solve the problem.

Carrying firearms in public places in most parts of India is also prohibited without a permit, but the licenses are almost impossible to obtain.

Another criticism is it is mostly men who are able to get a firearm license due to the bureaucracy of Indian firearm licensing system.
