= Smith & Wesson Model 500 =

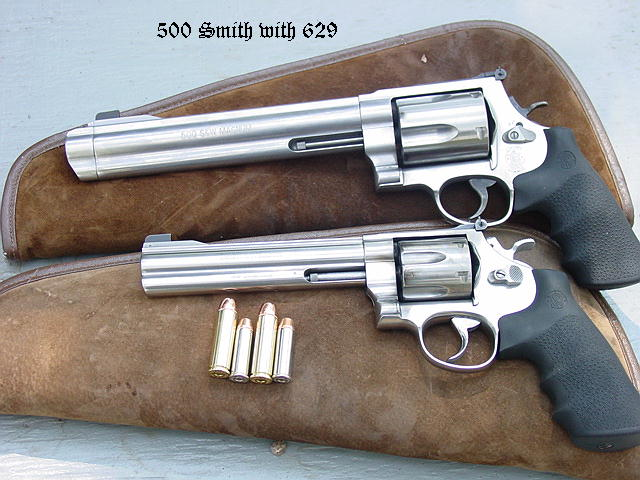
- A comparison of the Smith & Wesson Model 500 (above) and its .44 Magnum sibling, the Model 629 (below). The difference in size between the .44 Magnum and the .500 Magnum cartridges is also shown.
- Type: Revolver
- Place of origin: United States

Production history
- Designed: 2002–2003
- Manufacturer: Smith & Wesson
- Produced: 2003–present
- Variants: See Variants

Specifications
- Mass: 56 oz (1.59 kg) to 79.6 oz (2.26 kg)
- Barrel length: 2.75 in (69.8 mm); 3.5 in (88.9 mm); 4 in (102 mm); 6.5 in (165 mm); 7.5 in (191 mm); 8.38 in (213 mm); 10.5 in (267 mm)
- Cartridge: .500 S&W Magnum, .500 S&W Special
- Action: Double/Single Action
- Muzzle velocity: Approx. 2,075 feet per second (632 m/s)
- Effective firing range: 165 feet (50 m)
- Maximum firing range: 330 feet (100 m)
- Feed system: 5-round cylinder
- Sights: Iron sights, night sights

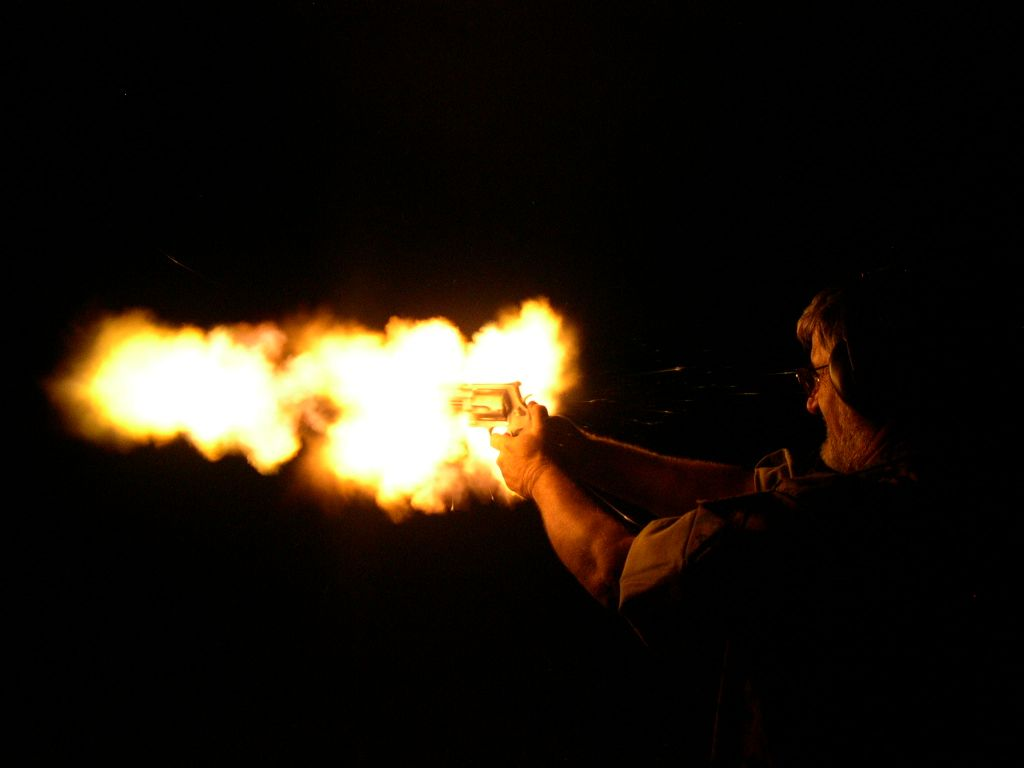
S&W Model 500 being fired at night

The Smith & Wesson Model 500 is a five-shot, double/single action large-caliber revolver produced by Smith & Wesson, firing the .500 S&W Magnum cartridge.

== Design ==
The Model 500 was built on the entirely new X-Frame, which was developed exclusively to handle the immense muzzle velocity and pressures generated by firing of the .500 Magnum cartridge. It is among the most powerful revolvers in the world since its original release in 2003, and is marketed as "the world's most powerful handgun" by the manufacturer.

The Model 500 can fire a bullet weighing 350 gr (23 g; 0.80 oz) at 1,975 feet per second (602 m/s) generating a muzzle energy of over 3,030 foot-pounds force (4.1 kJ), roughly twice that of the .50 AE Desert Eagle, and a momentum of 13.7 Newton seconds. Commercial loadings are available in bullet weights ranging from 275 to 700 gr (17.8 to 45.4 g; 0.63 to 1.60 oz). The Model 500 is capable of firing the shorter .500 S&W Special cartridge.

Instead of a traditional barrel, the S&W 500 uses a rifled tube inside a barrel shroud that is secured by tension from the front. This tensioning leads to stability, making barrels less expensive to produce and resulting in a more accurate revolver.

Lockup is accomplished by a center-pin in the rear of the cylinder and a ball detent in the frame.

The advanced design of the firearm helps in counteracting the recoil felt by the shooter. This includes the sheer weight of the firearm, including a full-length underlug contributing to a forward balance; use of rubber grips; and the use of a compensator. The compensator offers modest recoil reduction, but also increases muzzle blast. On certain S&W Performance Center models the compensator is replaced with a muzzle brake.

Like most large caliber handguns, the Model 500 is suitable for sport and hunting applications. Any of the available bullet weights can be relied on to take game at a range in excess of 200 yards (183 m), a feat matched by only a handful of other handguns. The high energy of these rounds makes it possible to hunt extremely large African game successfully.

== Variants ==
- Model 500ES: 2.75″ barrel, stainless steel Emergency Survival snubnosed revolver with blaze orange Hogue grips (no longer manufactured as of December 2009).
- Model 500: 3.5″ barrel, stainless steel with HI VIZ® fiber optic sight.
- Model 500: 4″ barrel, stainless steel with two compensators.
- Model 500: 6.5″ barrel, half lug, stainless steel with compensator (discontinued in 2020).
- Model 500: 7.5″ barrel, stainless steel with muzzle brake.
- Model 500: 8.38″ barrel, stainless steel with compensator.
- Model 500 HI VIZ®: 8.38″ barrel, stainless steel with interchangeable compensators.
- Model 500: 10.5″ Lothar-Walther custom German rifle barrel, matte finish stainless steel with muzzle brake.

Other variants are available through the Smith & Wesson's Performance Center. Like all Smith & Wesson revolvers, "custom" variants are available on special production runs with a minimum order of 500 units. An example is the John Ross Performance Center 5″ .500 S&W Magnum, which features a 5-inch barrel with an external muzzle nut instead of a muzzle brake or compensator and a Millet dovetail front sight.

== Gallery ==
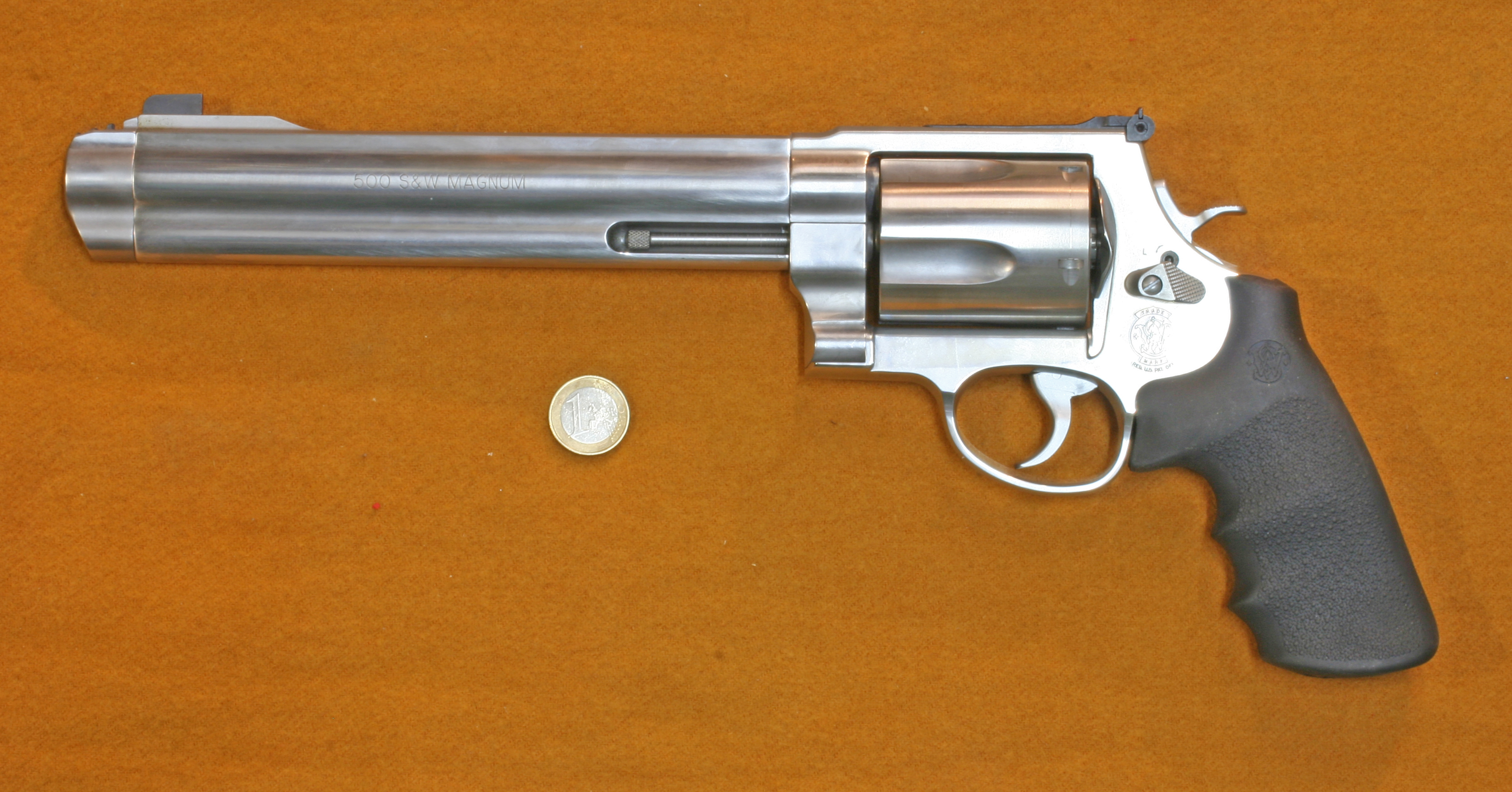

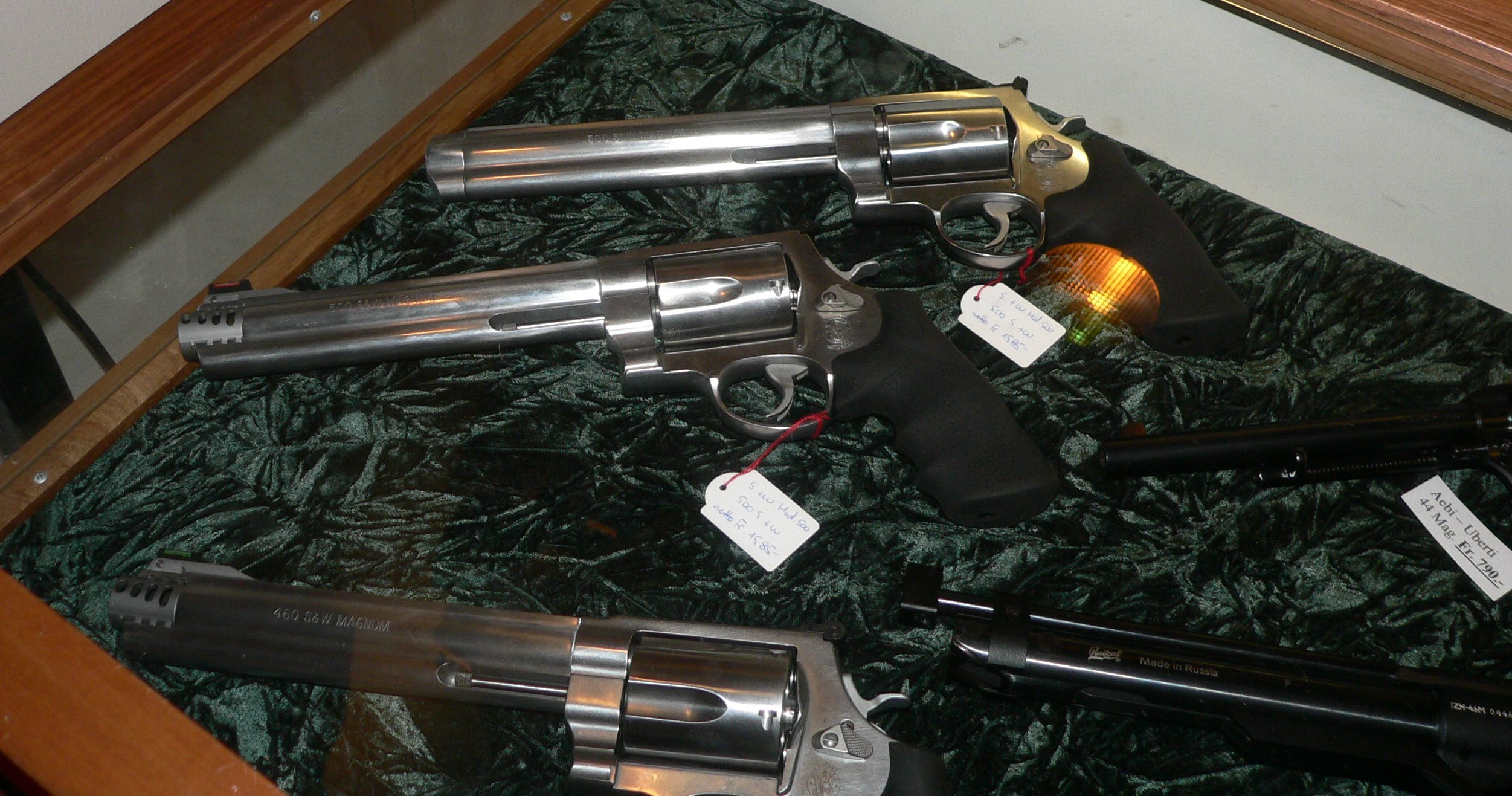

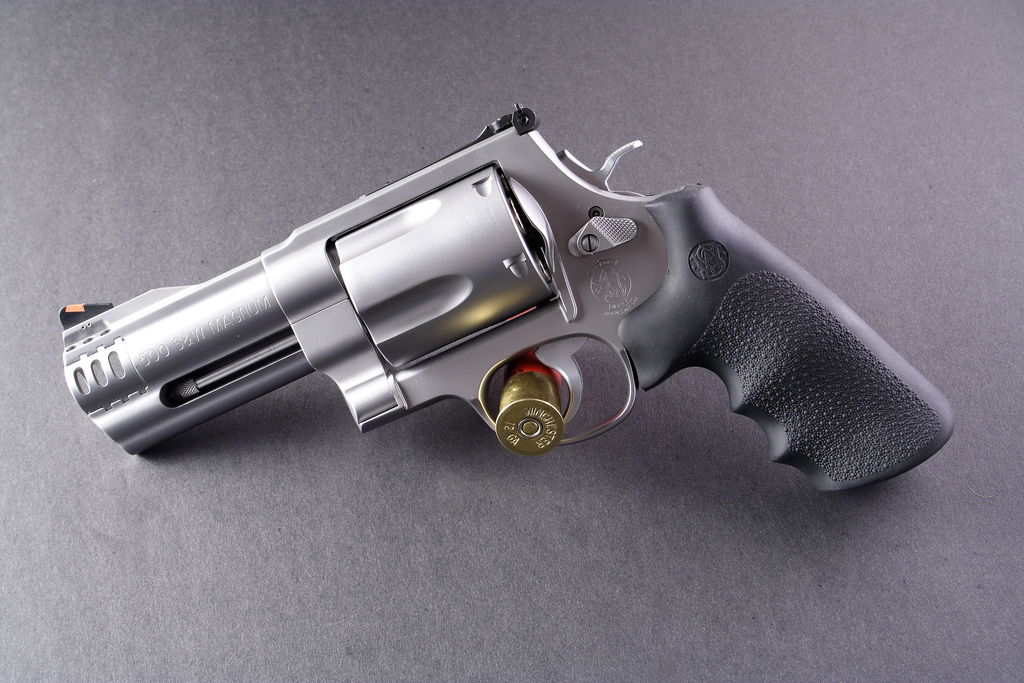

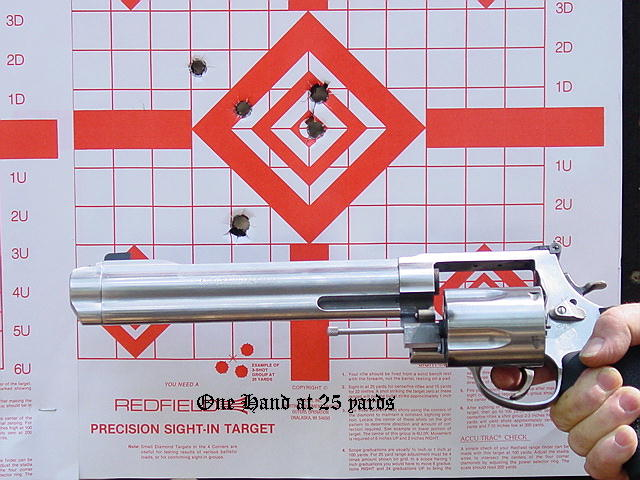

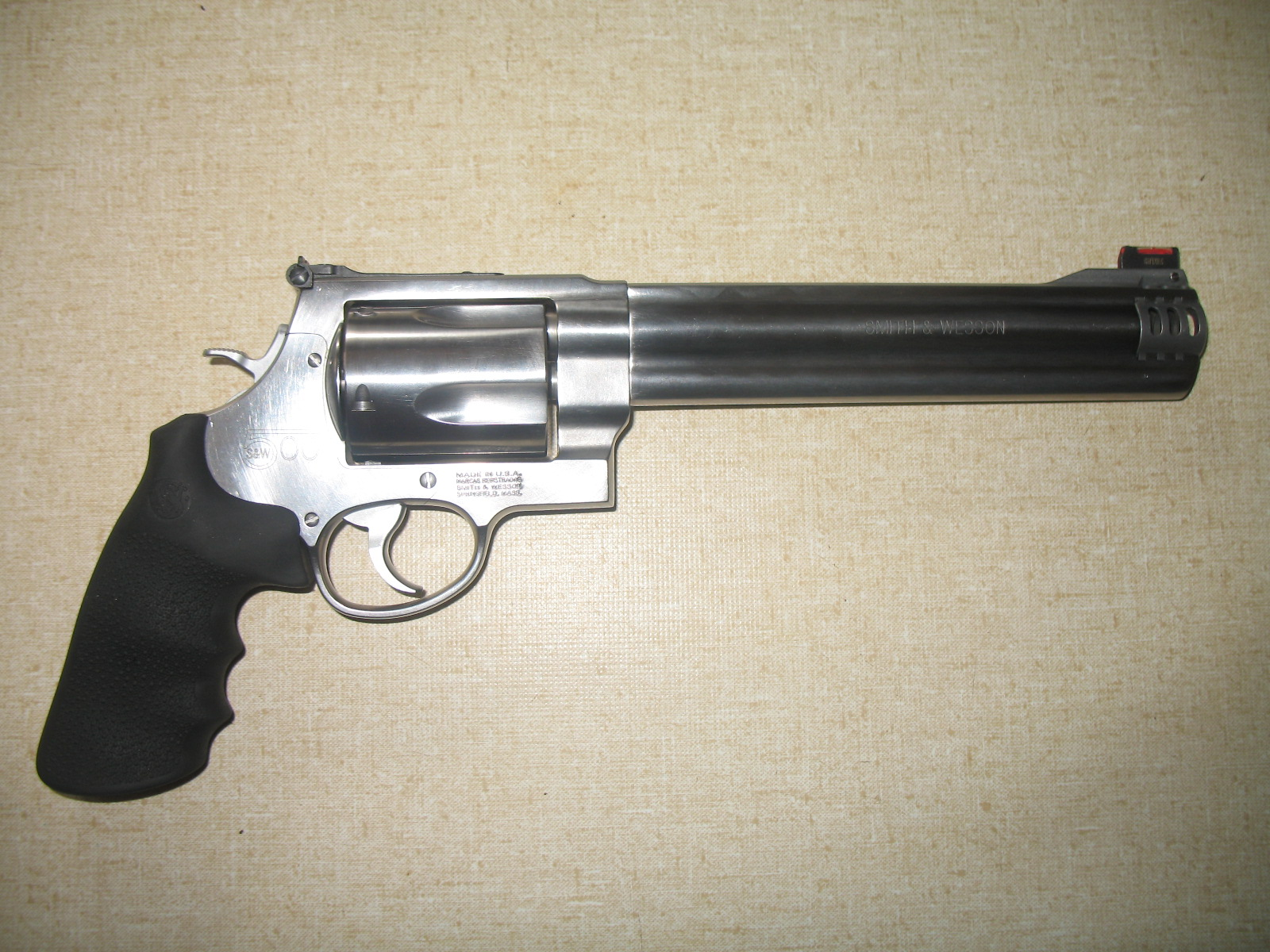

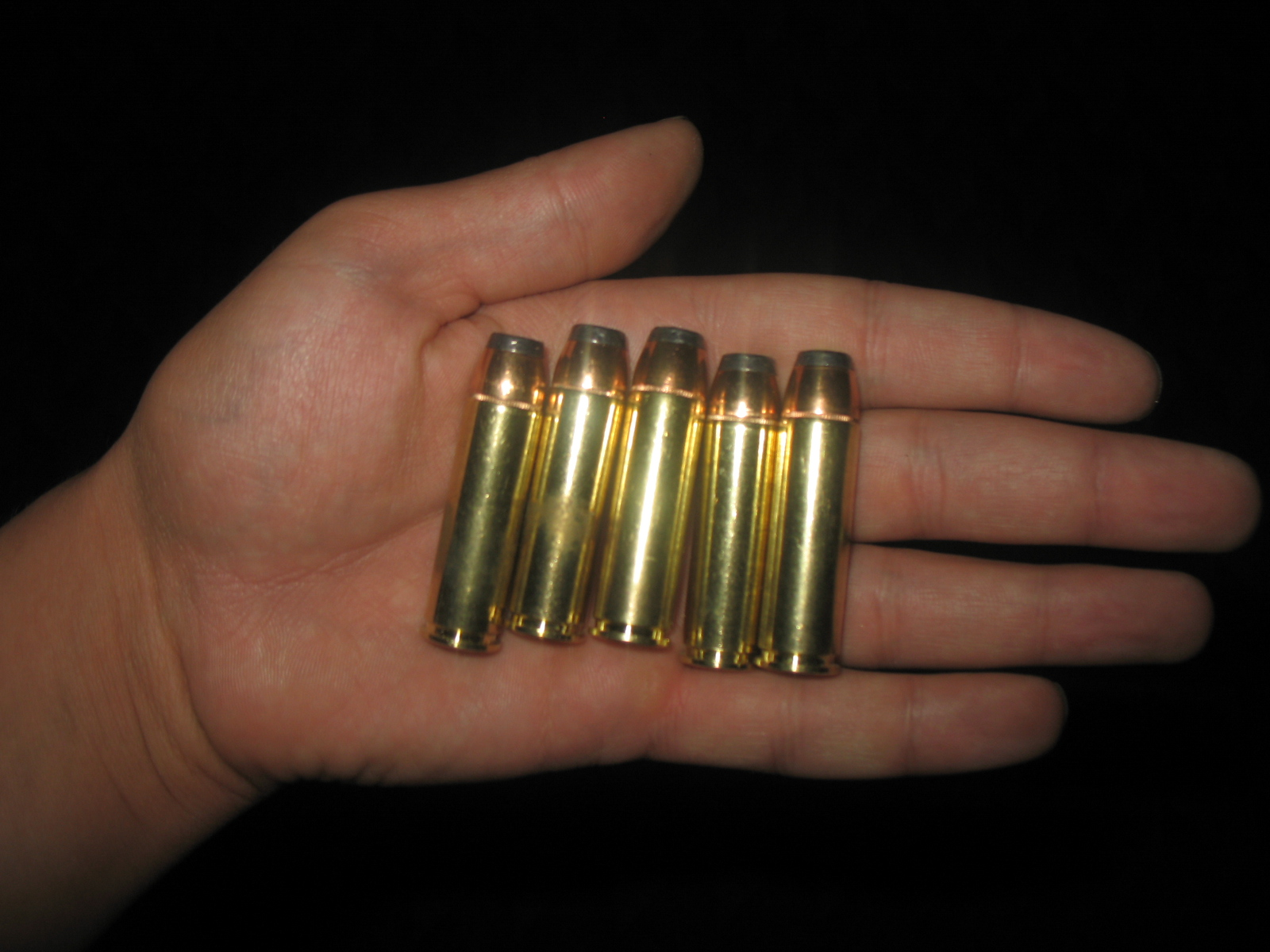

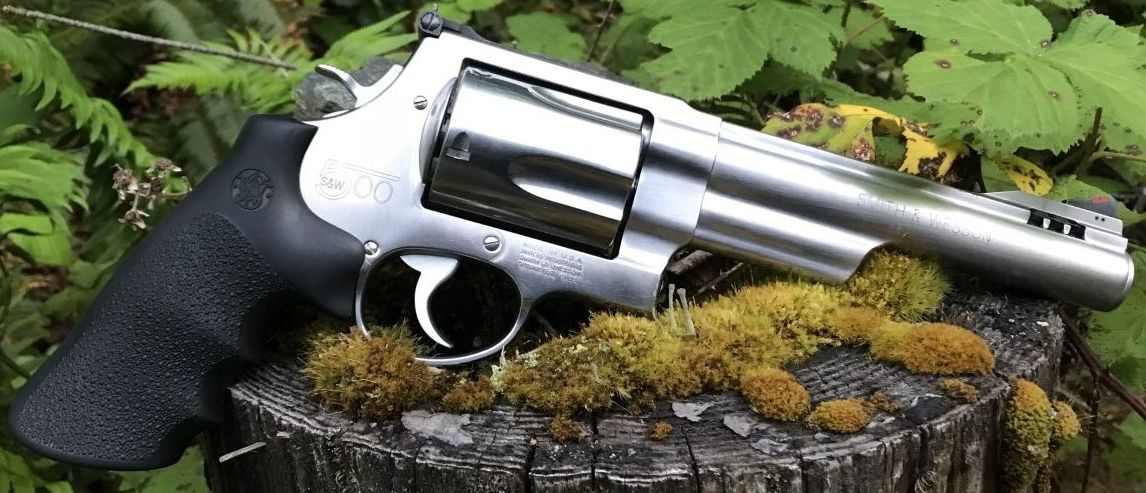
S&W Model 500, 6.5" barrel variant

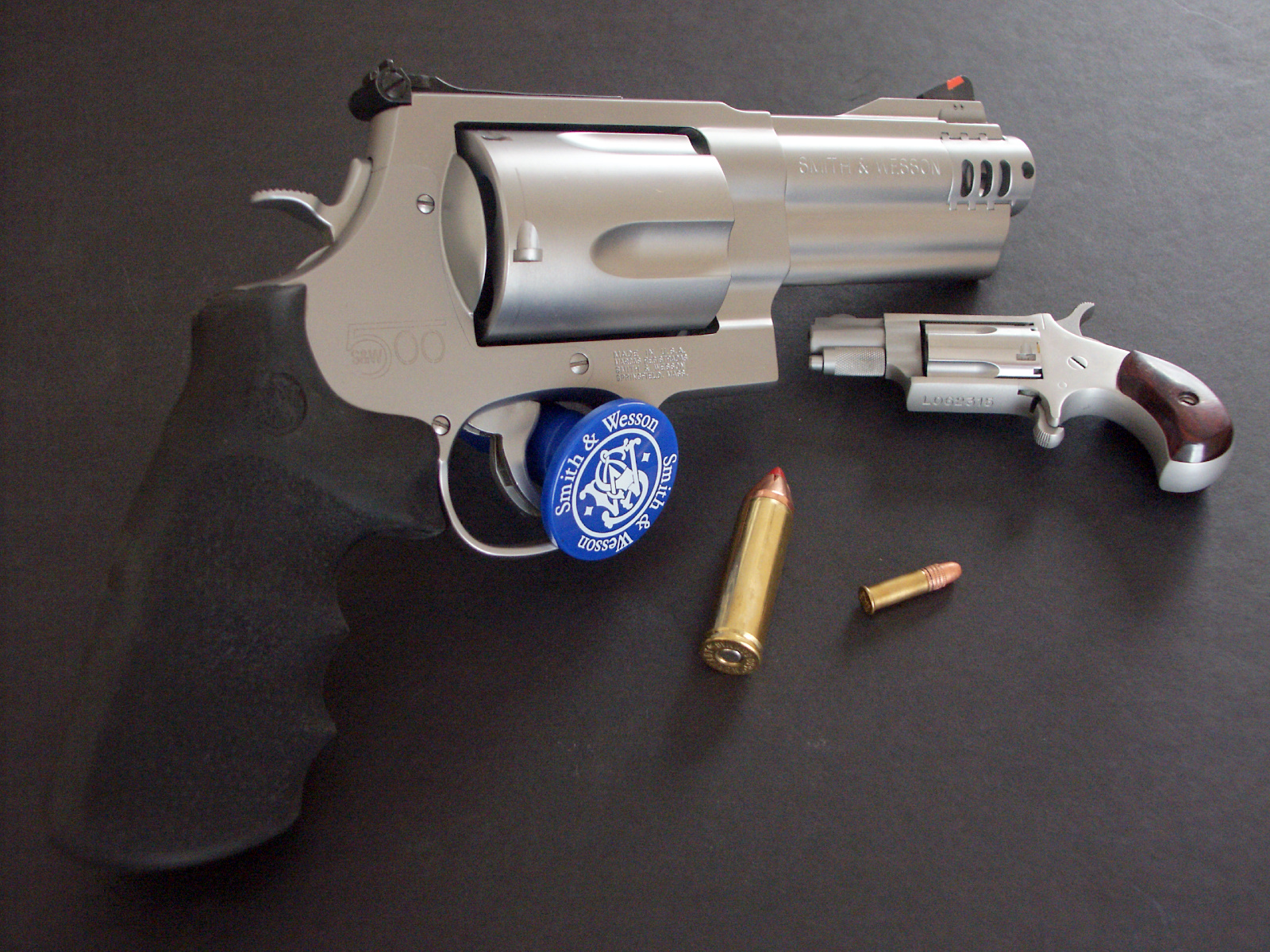
S&W 500 next to a NAA Mini-revolver

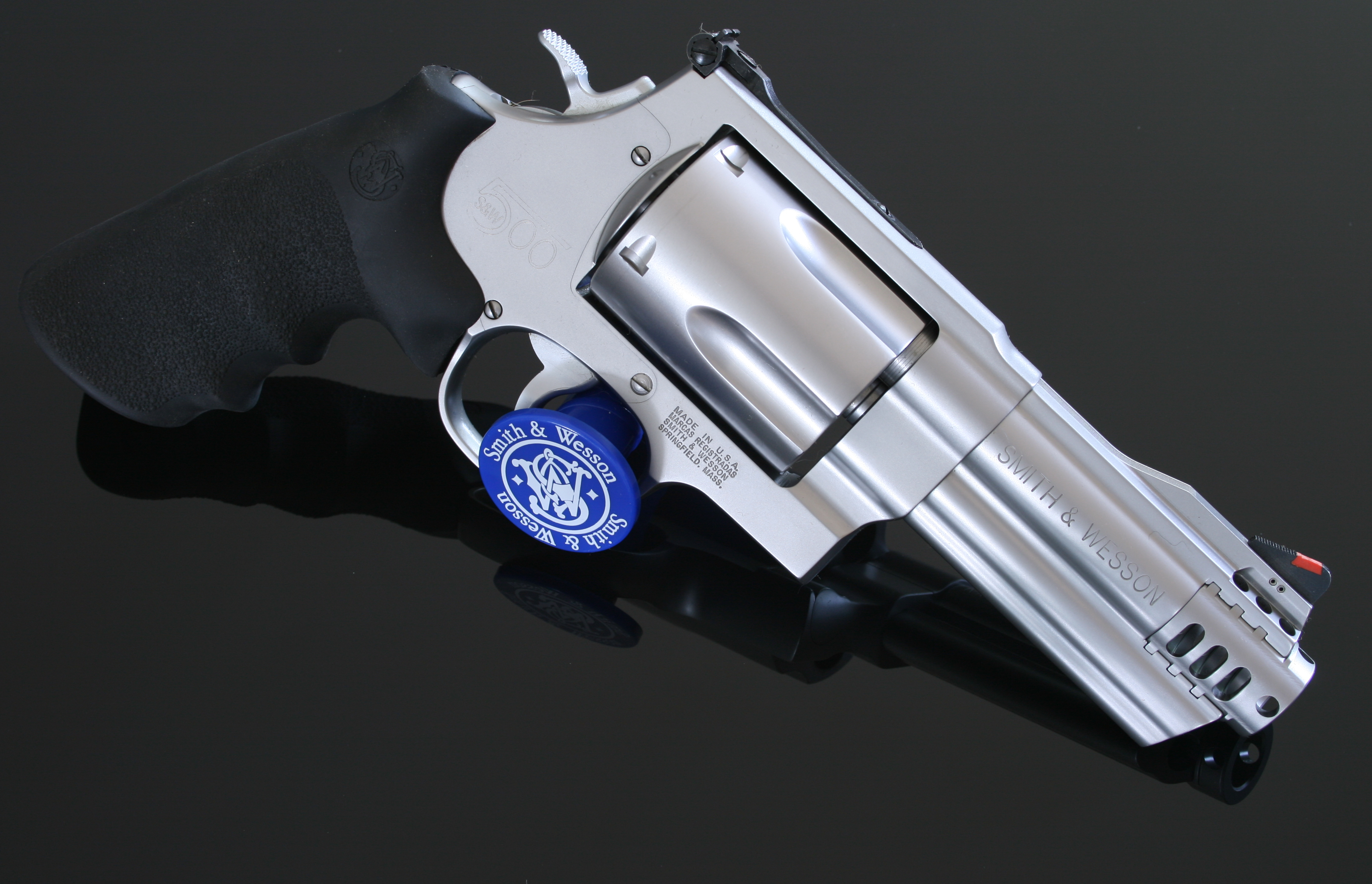

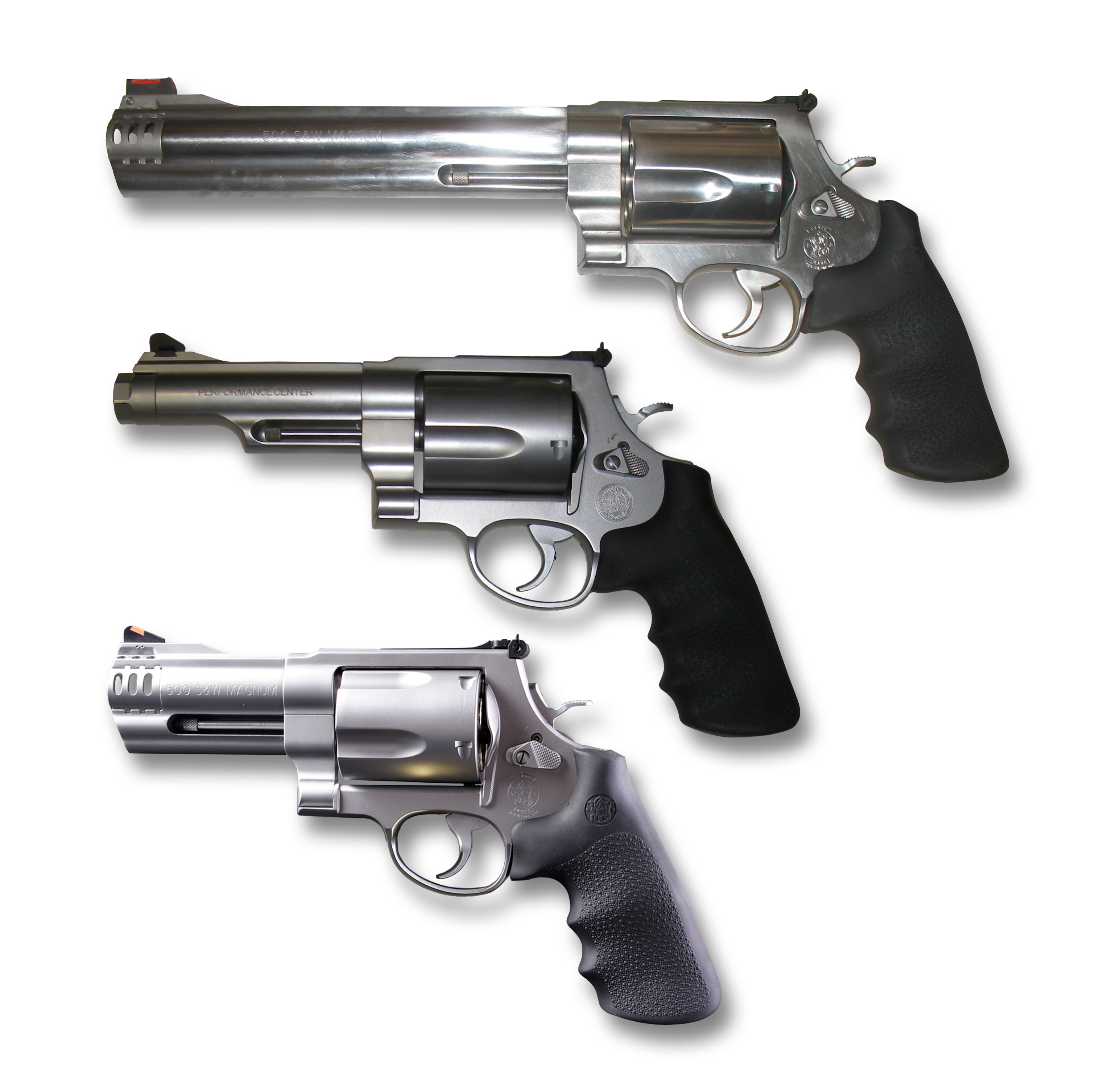

== See also ==
- .50 caliber handguns
- List of handgun cartridges
- Smith & Wesson Model 460
