= Dick Casull =

American gunsmith (1931–2018)

Dick Casull with a rifle.

Richard J. Casull (/kəˈsuːl/) (February 15, 1931 – May 6, 2018) was an American gunsmith and wildcat cartridge developer whose experiments with .45 Colt ammunition in the 1950s led to the creation of the .454 Casull cartridge. Casull, whose passion was six-shooters, was determined to create high-velocity rounds for the .45 Colt. His goal was to achieve a muzzle velocity of 2,000 feet per second with Colt .45 rounds fired from a single-action Army-style revolver with a 7 1/2-inch barrel. This proved impossible due to the tensile strength of the Colt .45 cylinder, so he set out to develop his own casing and bullet.

Casull began his career as a wildcat cartridge developer after having contact with Elmer Keith, an Idaho rancher, firearms enthusiast, and author, in the 1940s. Keith was instrumental in the development of the first magnum revolver cartridge, the .357 Magnum, as well as the later .44 Magnum and .41 Magnum cartridges. Casull was instrumental in the development of various wildcat cartridges, a few of which were later adopted as factory rounds.

Casull also worked with Oregon-based gunsmith P.O. Ackley, who developed a family of improved wildcat cartridges by rechambering extant firearms and fireforming the ammunition to decrease body taper and increase shoulder angle, resulting in a higher case capacity. Ackley not only improved standard cartridges but also created the first .17 caliber (4.5 mm) centerfire cartridge. He developed the .450 Ackley Magnum (based on a .375 H&H Magnum case necked up to .458) and the .475 Ackley Magnum (based on a .375 H&H Magnum necked up to .475 (12 mm)).

== Casull .454 cartridge ==
Though he developed many wildcat cartridges for pistols and rifles, Casull is most famous for creating the .454 Casull cartridge in 1957 with Duane Marsh and Jack Fullmer. It was first announced in November 1959 by Guns & Ammo magazine. The basic design was a lengthened and structurally improved .45 Colt case. The wildcat cartridge finally went mainstream in 1997, when Ruger began chambering its Super Redhawk in this caliber. Taurus followed with the Raging Bull model in 1998 and the Taurus Raging Judge Magnum in 2010. Taurus also made a now-discontinued Rossi-branded R92 lever action carbine clone of the Winchester 1892 chambered for the .454 Casull. For brush hunting and wilderness packing, the Rossi R92 carbine .454 Casull offered optional magazine-tube loading and a recoil absorbing butt pad.

== Mini Revolvers ==
Casull began developing a mini-revolver design, which was licensed by the short-lived Rocky Mountain Arms Corp. (RMAC) of Salt Lake City, Utah. In 1971, RMAC began producing a mini-revolver chambered in .22 Short. Casull's original design used a lever attached to the hammer to lock the cylinder in place. He later redesigned his mini-revolver to place the locking mechanism on the bottom of the frame, eliminating the lever attached to the hammer. He was granted U.S. Patents 4228606 and 4228608 in 1980 for the mechanism for mounting the cylinder to the frame for the cylinder locking mechanism, respectively.

== Freedom Arms ==
In 1978, Casull became a partner of Wayne Baker in the Freedom, Wyoming–based Freedom Arms firearms manufacturing business to produce a five-shot mini-revolver in .22 LR known as "The Patriot" (later offered in .22 Short and .22 WMR), as well a double action mini-revolver, the Casull CA-2000 Mini. A four-shot mini-revolver was also produced. Production of mini-revolvers ceased in 1990. Casull was granted U.S. Patent 4385463 in 1983 for a floating firing pin for mini-revolvers and U.S. Patent 4450992 in 1984 for a belt buckle holster that would hold a mini revolver. The mini-revolver design was sold to North American Arms.

=== Single-Action Revolvers ===
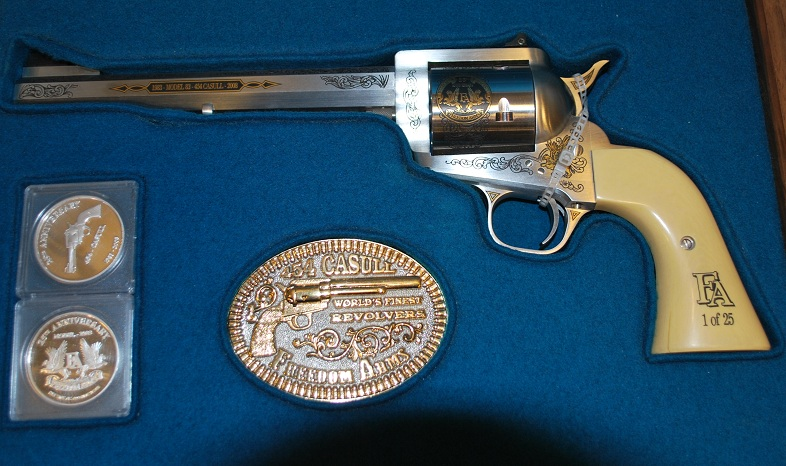
Freedom Arms M83 Revolver

Casull began building a number of five-shot prototypes on Ruger Super Blackhawk frames. The Freedom Arms Model 83 single-action revolver chambered in .454 Casull was introduced in 1983. This model remains in production as the Model 83.

A number of variants upon the Model 83 have been produced, all with five-shot cylinders. The first was a .45 Colt in February 1986, followed closely by a .44 Magnum version. In 1991, Freedom Arms introduced the Model 252 in .22 LR and in 1992 the model 353 in .357 Magnum. In 1993 the Model 555 was introduced in .50 Action Express. .41 Magnum and .475 Linebaugh chamberings were introduced in 1997 and 1999 respectively. Freedom Arms introduced their own .500 Wyoming Express in the Model 83 .500 WE in 2005.

The Model 97 design, with a Model 83 frame of reduced size, was introduced in 1997, originally with a six-shot .357 Magnum cylinder (.38 Special cylinder available). A five-shot .45 Colt chambering was introduced the following year, as was a five-shot .41 Magnum in 2000. Six-shot .22s are produced with .22 LR sporting- and match-grade cylinders available, as well as .22 Magnum. A five-shot .44 Special chambering followed in 2004.

The Model 2008, introduced in 2010, is a single-shot pistol with interchangeable barrels, most in rifle chamberings.

Other gun manufacturers have since begun manufacturing single-action revolvers chambered in .454 Casull.

=== Official Gun of Wyoming Proposal ===
In 2013, Wyoming State Rep. Richard Cannady (R-Glenrock) introduced a bill to designate the Freedom Arms Model 83 single-action revolver chambered in .454 Casull as Wyoming's official state gun.

== See also ==
- List of cartridges by caliber
- List of handgun cartridges
