= .500 S&W Special =

Revolver cartridge designed by Cor-bon and Glazer

- Type: Handgun
- Place of origin: United States

Production history
- Designer: Cor-Bon/Glaser
- Designed: 2004
- Produced: 2004–present

Specifications
- Parent case: 500 S&W Magnum
- Case type: Semi-rimmed, straight
- Bullet diameter: .500 in (12.7 mm)
- Neck diameter: .526 in (13.4 mm)
- Base diameter: .526 in (13.4 mm)
- Rim diameter: .556 in (14.1 mm)
- Rim thickness: .056 in (1.4 mm)
- Case length: 1.274 in (32.4 mm)
- Overall length: 1.733 in (44.0 mm)

Ballistic performance
Bullet mass/type	Velocity	Energy
350 gr (23 g) FMJ	1,100 ft/s (340 m/s)	941 ft⋅lbf (1,276 J)
350 gr (23 g) JHP	1,250 ft/s (380 m/s)	1,215 ft⋅lbf (1,647 J)
- Test barrel length: 8.375 in Source(s): Cor-Bon

The .500 S&W Special or 12.7x32mmSR is a .50 caliber revolver cartridge developed by Cor-Bon/Glaser (at Smith & Wesson's request) in 2004.

== Description ==
It is a shorter version of the .500 S&W Magnum, with a drastically reduced load, much as the .38 Special is to the .357 Magnum. However, unlike the .357 Magnum being developed from the less powerful .38 Special, the .500 Special was designed after the more powerful .500 Magnum.

The purpose of the .500 Special is to be able to shoot less punishing loads, with a muzzle energy closer to that of the .44 Magnum cartridge, in firearms chambered for the .500 S&W Magnum. It is possible that firearms chambered for only the .500 S&W Special will be developed by Smith & Wesson. Smith & Wesson has been urged by author and gun rights activist John Ross to produce their largest "X-Frame" in a shorter version to handle this cartridge. Ballistics are slightly superior to the .480 Ruger.

== See also ==
- 12 mm caliber
- List of handgun cartridges
