= .440 Cor-Bon =

Rifle cartridge

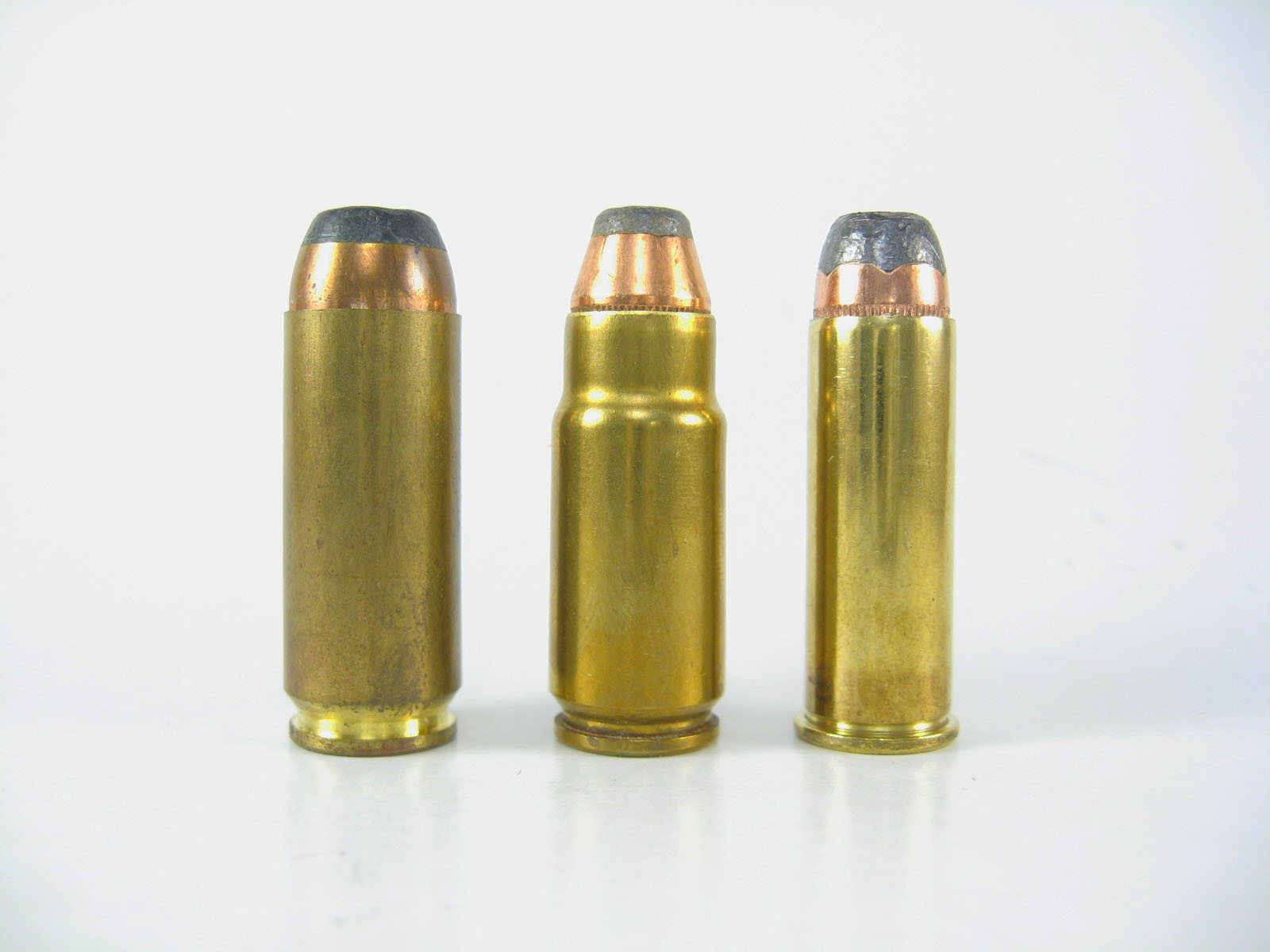
- .50 AE, .440 Cor-Bon and .44 Magnum
- Type: Pistol and rifle
- Place of origin: United States

Production history
- Designed: 1997
- Manufacturer: Cor-Bon
- Produced: 1998–present

Specifications
- Parent case: .50 AE
- Case type: Rebated, bottleneck
- Bullet diameter: .429 in (10.9 mm)
- Neck diameter: .461 in (11.7 mm)
- Shoulder diameter: .529 in (13.4 mm)
- Base diameter: .538 in (13.7 mm)
- Rim diameter: .510 in (13.0 mm)
- Rim thickness: 0.055 in (1.4 mm)
- Case length: 1.280 in (32.5 mm)
- Overall length: 1.590 in (40.4 mm)
- Case capacity: 50.5 gr H_{2}O (3.27 cm^{3})
- Rifling twist: 1 in 18
- Primer type: 0.210
- Maximum pressure (SAAMI): 36,000 (250 MPa)

Ballistic performance
Bullet mass/type	Velocity	Energy
240 gr (15.55 g) JHP Cor-Bon	1,800 ft/s (550 m/s)	1,727 ft⋅lbf (2,341 J)
260 gr (17 g) BCHP Cor-Bon	1,700 ft/s (520 m/s)	1,669 ft⋅lbf (2,263 J)
305 gr (20 g) RNPN Cor-Bon	1,600 ft/s (490 m/s)	1,734 ft⋅lbf (2,351 J)

The .440 Cor-Bon is a large-caliber handgun cartridge, first produced by Cor-Bon in 1998. Although it looks similar to a .357 SIG, this cartridge was designed after being necked down from an existing cartridge, the .50 AE to accept a .44-caliber (.429 in) (10.89 mm) bullet. This is fairly typical in the wildcat cartridge industry. The .429 DE cartridge (introduced in 2018) is similar but incompatible.

== History ==
The .50 AE was introduced in the Desert Eagle from Magnum Research in 1991. Shortly thereafter, shooters began requesting an alternative to the relatively small selection of factory ammunition, and, for sensitive shooters, the recoil of the .50 AE cartridge, but still with substantially more stopping power than the .44 Magnum.

In designing the .440, Cor-Bon created a lighter recoiling round than the .50 AE with greater penetrating power than the .50 AE and .44 Magnum. The round has a flatter trajectory, and leaves the barrel considerably faster than either the .50 AE or the .44 Mag. However, the cartridge has never been popular, and has remained fairly expensive. Consequentially, Magnum Research no longer produces a Desert Eagle in .440 Cor-Bon, but has introduced a similar cartridge, the .429 DE. The .440 Cor-Bon cartridge will not chamber in a 429 DE barrel, but a 429 DE will chamber in a .440 Cor-Bon barrel.

== Uses ==
The round is generally considered to be for hunting big game, rather than for defensive purposes, for a number of reasons. Its excessive penetration and recoil make it unsuitable for self-defense, it is a physically larger cartridge, commonly chambered in a large pistols such as the Desert Eagle, and it is not particularly practical to carry it concealed.

It is effective at disabling and killing large animals, able to penetrate large bones, such as the shoulder, in deer. Some gunsmiths are chambering lever-action rifles to take full advantage of this cartridge on large game. Tromix also produced AR-15 rifles and uppers chambered in .440 Cor-Bon from 1999–2004. Only about 20 were manufactured before being discontinued.

== See also ==
- List of handgun cartridges
- 10 mm caliber Other similar size cartridges
- .429 DE Similar but incompatible cartridge
