= .25 NAA =

Pistol cartridge introduced by the North American Arms company in 2002

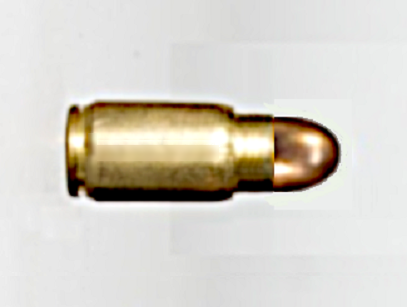
- .25 NAA basic shape
- Type: Pistol
- Place of origin: United States

Production history
- Designer: J.B. Wood
- Designed: 1999
- Manufacturer: North American Arms
- Produced: 2002–present

Specifications
- Parent case: .32 ACP
- Case type: Rimless, bottlenecked
- Bullet diameter: .251 in (6.4 mm)
- Neck diameter: .276 in (7.0 mm)
- Shoulder diameter: .333 in (8.5 mm)
- Base diameter: .337 in (8.6 mm)
- Rim diameter: .337 in (8.6 mm)
- Rim thickness: .046 in (1.2 mm)
- Case length: .745 in (18.9 mm)
- Overall length: .960 in (24.4 mm)
- Case capacity: 9.75 gr H_{2}O (0.632 cm^{3})
- Rifling twist: 1 in 16 in (410 mm)
- Primer type: Small Pistol
- Maximum pressure: 23,000 psi (160 MPa)

Ballistic performance
Bullet mass/type	Velocity	Energy
35 gr (2 g) XTP	1,200 ft/s (370 m/s)	121 ft⋅lbf (164 J)
- Source: Cartridges of the World

The .25 NAA is a pistol cartridge introduced by the North American Arms company in 2002. It was originally created for use in a smaller and lighter model of their Guardian pistol.

Despite popular belief, the 25 NAA cartridge is not based on the 32 ACP case. It is based on a rimless version of the .32 ACP case, shortened to .745" and necked down to accept .251-inch diameter (.25 ACP) bullets. The 32 ACP case, at only .680" long is too short for use in 25 NAA production.

== History and design ==
The cartridge was originally conceived of and prototyped by gunwriter J.B. Wood, and called the "25/32 JBW".

North American Arms and Cor-Bon Ammunition then further developed the cartridge, and the NAA Guardian .25 NAA pistol combination for production in consultation with Ed Sanow.

== Introduction ==
The finalized cartridge and pistol were introduced at the 2004 SHOT Show.

It followed the successful introduction of two other commercial bottleneck handgun cartridges, the .357 SIG in 1994 (which necked a .40 S&W case down to accept .355 caliber bullets); and the .400 Corbon in 1996 (which necked a .45 ACP case down to accept .40 caliber bullets).

== Performance ==
According to NAA's website, the .25 NAA's 35 gr bullets travel faster (1,200 f.p.s.) and hit harder (20% more energy on average) than larger, .32 ACP caliber, bullets.

== See also ==
- .32 NAA
- 5.45×18mm
