= Model 500 =

Model 500 may refer to:

- A pseudonym used by techno music producer Juan Atkins
- Smith & Wesson Model 500, a revolver
- Model 500 telephone, a model manufactured by Western Electric
