= Freedom Arms =

Freedom, Wyoming based firearm manufacturing company

Freedom Arms Inc.
- Type: Privately held company
- Industry: firearms
- Founded: 1978; 48 years ago
- Founder: Wayne Baker, Dick Casull
- Headquarters: Freedom, Lincoln County, Wyoming, United States
- Area served: worldwide
- Key people: Bob Baker (President)
- Products: Pistols, revolvers
- Website: www.freedomarms.com

Freedom Arms is a Freedom, Wyoming–based firearm manufacturing company, known for producing powerful single-action revolvers. The company was founded in 1978 by Wayne Baker and Dick Casull to produce a mini-revolver, then later a revolver chambered in Casull's powerful .454 Casull revolver cartridge. This five-shot revolver was the Model 83. Freedom Arms currently makes a single-shot pistol in addition to their revolvers.

== Models ==
Freedom Arms' first offering was a five-shot mini-revolver in .22 Long Rifle known as "The Patriot". It was later offered in .22 Short and .22 Winchester Rimfire Magnum. A beltbuckle holster version was patented by Richard J. "Dick" Casull (U.S. patent 4,450,992) to accommodate the small revolver. A boot pistol model was available with a longer barrel. A four-shot mini-revolver was produced by Freedom Arms, but production ceased in 1990, and the design was sold to North American Arms.

Co-founder Dick Casull had been experimenting with several prototype revolver cartridges since 1956. Casull felt he could offer a more powerful version of the .45 Colt and .44 Remington Magnum and built a number of five-shot prototypes on Ruger Super Blackhawk frames. Freedom Arms was the first commercial producer of revolvers chambered in this caliber, the .454 Casull, in 1983. This model is still manufactured today as the Model 83.

Several variants of the Model 83 have been produced, all with five-shot cylinders. The first was a.45 Colt in February 1986 (of which fifty-four units sold between 1986 and 1989), followed closely by a.44 Magnum version. In 1991, Freedom Arms introduced the Model 252 in.22 LR and in 1992 the Model 353 in .357 Magnum, including a nine-inch variation produced to meet the four-pound maximum weight requirement for IHMSA Silhouette competition. In 1993, the Model 555 was introduced in .50 Action Express; .41 Magnum and .475 Linebaugh chamberings were introduced in 1997 and 1999, respectively. Freedom Arms introduced their own .500 Wyoming Express in the Model 83 .500 WE in 2005.

At least two variants of the Model 83 with a three-inch barrel and lacking an ejector were produced in.454 Casull and.44 Magnum. These variants, named "Marshall" and "Packer," have symmetrical frames, made possible by the lack of an ejector.

The Model 97 design, with a smaller frame than the Model 83, was introduced in 1997, originally with a six-shot.357 Magnum cylinder (a.38 Special cylinder was available). A five-shot.45 Colt chambering was introduced the following year, as was a five-shot .41 Magnum in 2000. Six-shot revolvers produced with .22 Long Rifle sporting- and match-grade cylinders available, as well as .22 Winchester Rimfire Magnum from 2003. A five-shot .44 Special chambering followed in 2004. In 2009, Freedom Arms announced the .224-32 FA and began producing a six-shot in this chambering.

The Model 2008, which was introduced in 2010, is a single-shot pistol with interchangeable barrels, available in various rifle chamberings.

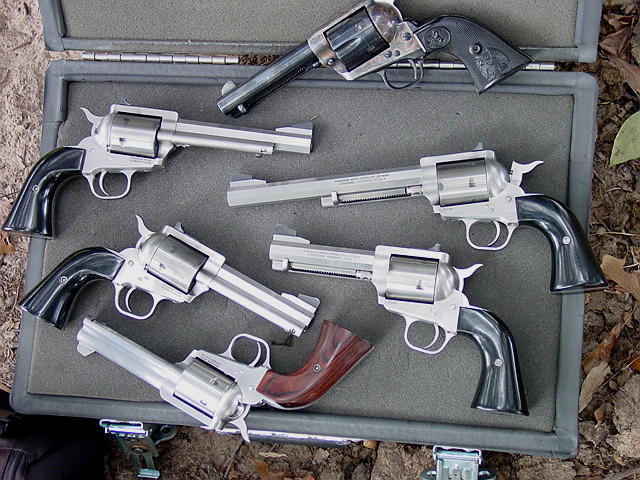
Freedom Arms revolvers with a Colt 1873P above.

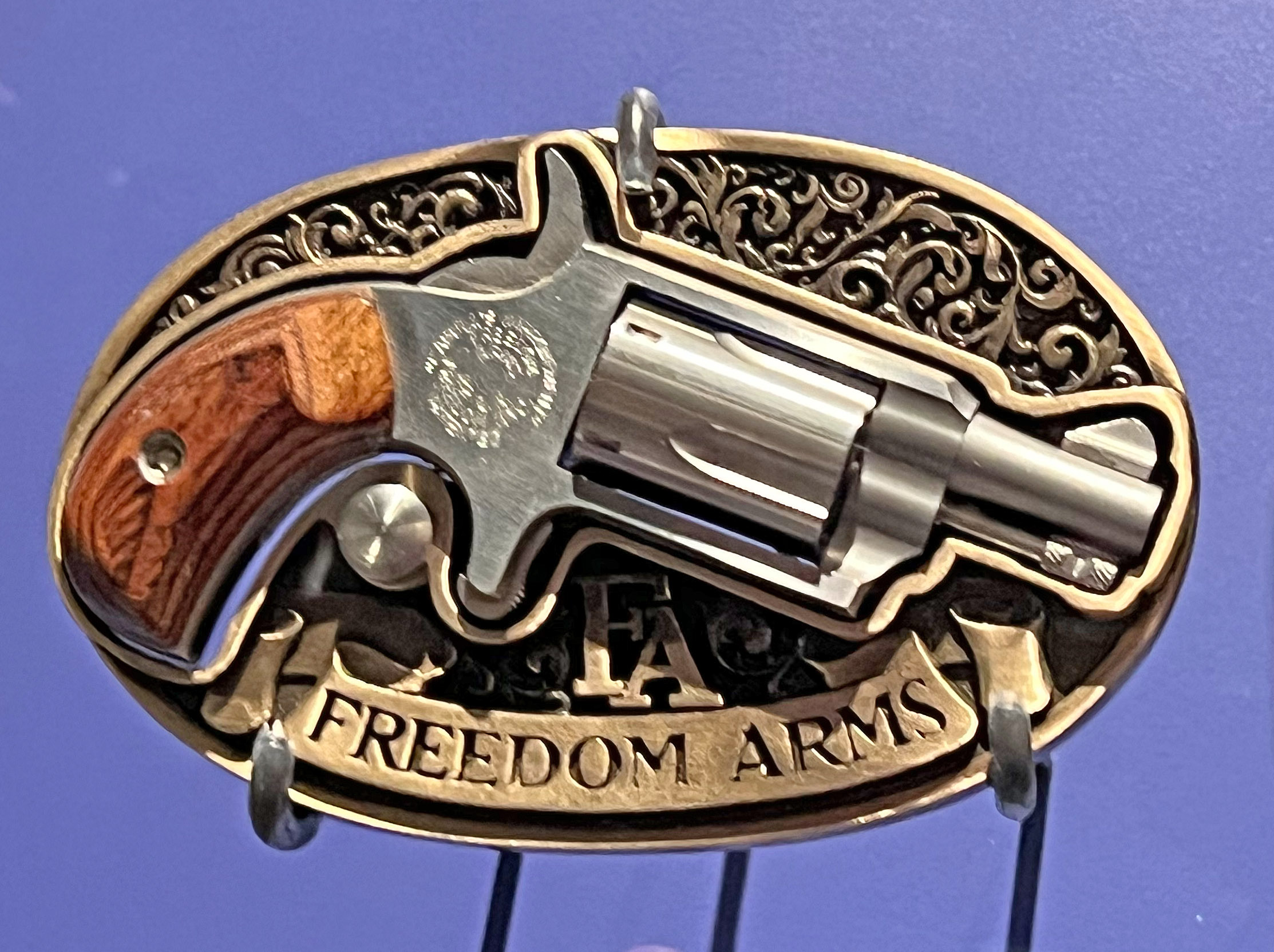
Freedom Arms Belt-Buckle Revolver, .22 LR, on display at the Cody Firearms Museum, Buffalo Bill Center of the West, Cody, Wyoming.

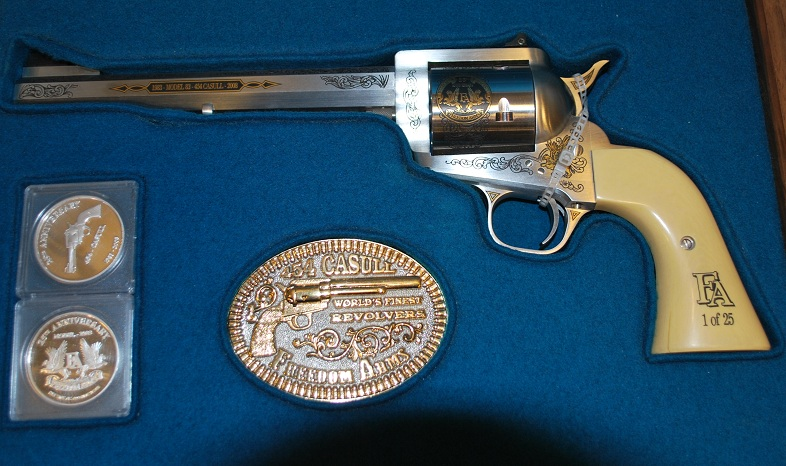
Freedom Arms M83 Revolver

== Proprietary cartridges ==
=== .224-32 FA ===
.224-32 FA
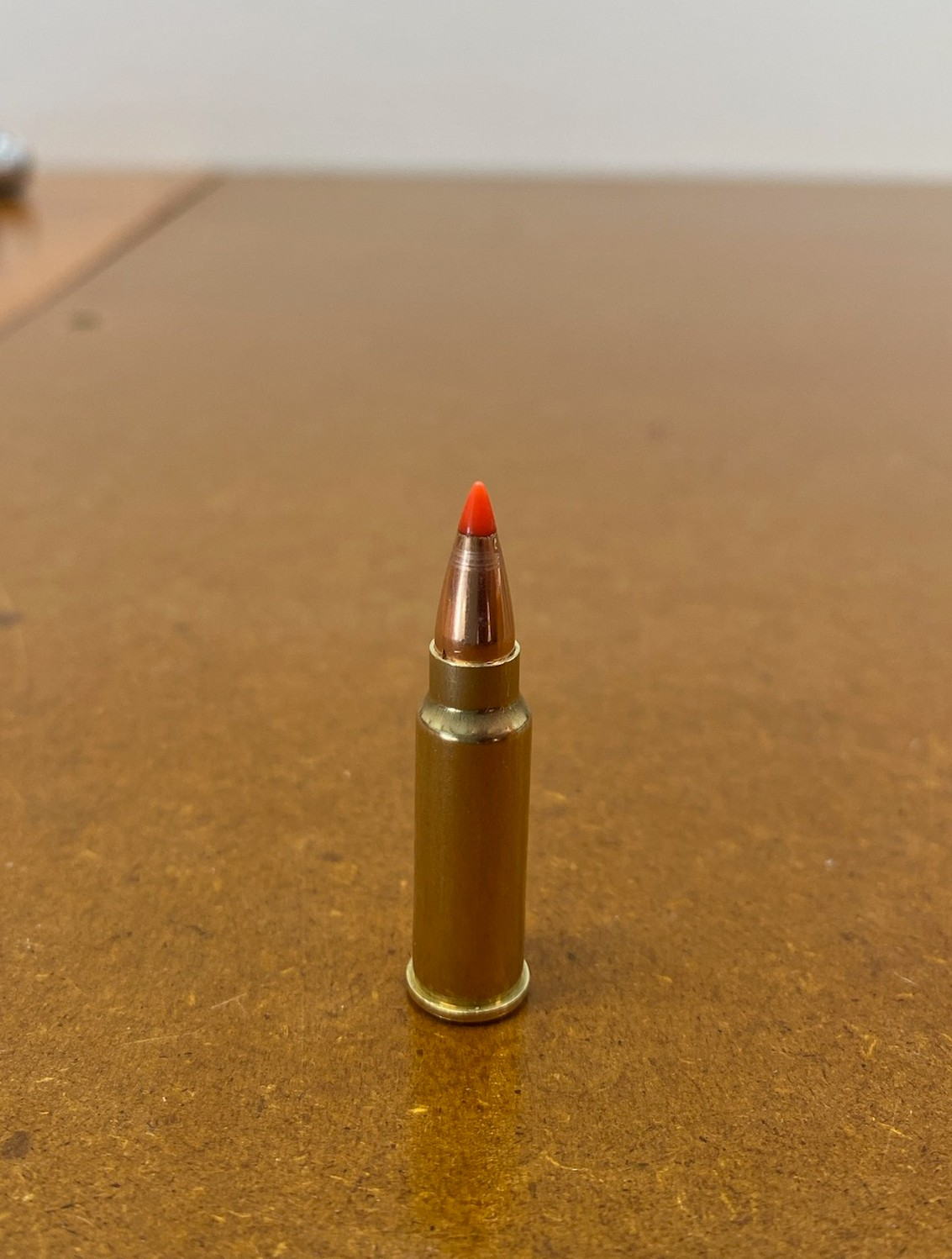
- Type: Revolver
- Place of origin: United States

Production history
- Designer: Freedom Arms, Inc.
- Designed: 2009
- Produced: 2009–present

Specifications
- Parent case: .327 Federal
- Case type: Rimmed, bottleneck
- Bullet diameter: .224 in (5.7 mm)
- Case length: 1.12 in (28 mm)
- Overall length: 1.6 in (41 mm)
- Rifling twist: 1–9 in (2.5–22.9 cm)
- Primer type: Small pistol

Ballistic performance
Bullet mass/type	Velocity	Energy
40 gr (3 g) Hornady V-Max	2,295 ft/s (700 m/s)	468 ft⋅lbf (635 J)
- Test barrel length: 10 in (25 cm)

The .224-32 FA is a wildcat cartridge designed and produced in 2009 by Freedom Arms for use in their Model 97 revolver. The .224-32 FA was designed to provide a high-performance .22 caliber centerfire cartridge that would work in a revolver, and is capable of taking varmints and predators up to the size of coyotes.
