= .429 DE =

American pistol cartridge for the Desert Eagle

- Type: Pistol
- Place of origin: United States

Production history
- Designer: Jim Tertin
- Designed: 2018
- Manufacturer: Magnum Research
- Produced: 2018–present

Specifications
- Parent case: .50 AE
- Case type: Rebated, bottleneck
- Bullet diameter: .429 in (10.9 mm)
- Case length: (33 mm)
- Primer type: Large pistol magnum
- Maximum pressure (SAAMI): 46,000 psi (317 MPa)

Ballistic performance
Bullet mass/type	Velocity	Energy
240 gr (16 g) Glacier Ridge JHP	1,625 fps (495.3 m/s)	1,407 ft-lbs (1907.6 J)
210 gr (14 g) Glacier Ridge JHP	1,750 fps (533.4 m/s)	1,427 ft-lbs (1934.8 J)
- Test barrel length: 6 inches

The .429 DE (10.9×33mmRB) is a cartridge introduced in 2018 by Magnum Research for the Desert Eagle line of handguns.

== Design ==
The .429 DE is a .50 AE case that is necked down to accept .429-diameter (10.9mm) bullets used in the .44 Magnum. The cartridge features a 25% increase in velocity and 45% increase of energy over a standard 240-grain .44 Magnum load of 1,285 ft⋅lbf (1,742 J) at 100 yd (91 m). The .429 DE offers increased speed and accuracy over the .50 AE due to its lighter and slimmer projectile. Also, due to its use of the same cartridge design, one can easily convert a .50 AE Desert Eagle to .429 DE with only a barrel change. Though very similar to the obsolete .440 Cor-Bon, it is not interchangeable with that cartridge. The same bolt and magazines can be used with both the .429 DE and the .50 AE-chambered Desert Eagle. In 2021, the .429 DE was accepted into SAAMI standardization.

== See also ==
- 10 mm caliber
- Table of handgun and rifle cartridges
