= .400 Cor-Bon =

Automatic pistol cartridge

.400 Corbon
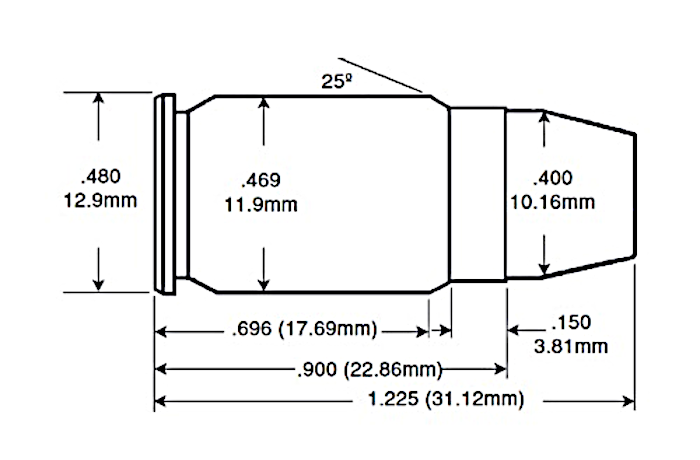
- Type: Pistol
- Place of origin: United States

Production history
- Designer: Peter Pi
- Designed: 1997
- Manufacturer: Cor-Bon
- Produced: 1997–present

Specifications
- Parent case: .45 ACP
- Case type: Rimless, bottleneck
- Bullet diameter: .401 in (10.2 mm)
- Neck diameter: .423 in (10.7 mm)
- Shoulder diameter: .469 in (11.9 mm)
- Base diameter: .470 in (11.9 mm)
- Rim diameter: .471 in (12.0 mm)
- Rim thickness: .050 in (1.3 mm)
- Case length: .898 in (22.8 mm)
- Overall length: 1.20 in (30 mm)
- Rifling twist: 16
- Primer type: small pistol/rifle
- Maximum pressure: 29,000 psi (200 MPa)

Ballistic performance
Bullet mass/type	Velocity	Energy
135 gr (9 g) JHP	1,400 ft/s (430 m/s)	588 ft⋅lbf (797 J)
150 gr (10 g) JHP	1,310 ft/s (400 m/s)	572 ft⋅lbf (776 J)
165 gr (11 g) JHP	1,250 ft/s (380 m/s)	573 ft⋅lbf (777 J)

The .400 Corbon (10.2x22mm) is an automatic pistol cartridge developed by Cor-Bon in 1997. It was created to mimic the ballistics of the 10 mm Auto cartridge in a .45 ACP form factor.

It is essentially a .45 ACP case, necked down to .40 caliber with a 25-degree shoulder.

== History and design ==
Peter Pi, founder of Cor-Bon and the designer of the cartridge, explained his reason for developing the cartridge: "Velocity is the key to making hollowpoint bullets work. The added velocity assures that the hollowpoint will open up even if plugged with material. This reduces the risk of overpenetration and allows the action of the hollowpoint bullet to dump the available energy into the target."

Pi said because he wanted the .400 Corbon to be easy for handloaders to make, he based the cartridge on the ubiquitous .45 ACP so that an ample supply of cases was readily available, gave the shoulder a 25-degree angle, and head-spaced it on the case shoulder rather than the mouth so that over-all-length is not critical and the bullet can take a tight roll crimp to avoid setback and to get a more efficient powder burn.

== Performance ==
According to Guns & Ammo magazine,

Performance is on a par with the 10 mm, yet pressures are much milder. Factory ammo is loaded to +P .45 levels, but the lighter bullet weights make recoil comparable to .45 hardball loads. Felt recoil is a little sharper but still very controllable.

Because of its relatively high velocity for a handgun round, the .400 Corbon offers a very flat trajectory, which in turn allows the firearms chambered for it more effective range. Ed Sanow also felt recoil was equivalent to 230 gr (15 g) hardball in .45 ACP. In addition, the bottleneck case can function better than a straight case with a wider variety of bullet shapes and sizes and allows the use of fully supported barrels.

Ballistics fall somewhere between the .40 S&W and the 10 mm Auto. Unlike the 10 mm which operates at a SAAMI maximum of 37,500 psi, the .400 Corbon operates at 29,000 psi (although one source states that the pressure is 26,500 psi), much closer to the SAAMI maximum pressures for .45 ACP (21,000 psi), and .45 ACP +P (23,000 psi). SAAMI Maximum Average Pressure for 400 Cor-Bon is 35,000 psi. In 2008, Michael Shovel, then National Sales Manager for CORBON/Glaser, stated that Cor-Bon "submitted the 400 COR-BON to SAAMI and it was approved [in 2006]. Pressures for the 400 are in the 23,000 PSI range." The difference between SAAMI maximum average pressure is only 2,500 psi and identical to that of the .40 S&W (35,000 psi).

The .400 Corbon is a versatile cartridge useful for target shooting, practical shooting competition, self-defense, and the handgun hunting of small and medium game. The loads with the lighter bullets are appropriate for small game. Handloaders have worked up safe loads using 180 gr (12 g) bullets at 1,250 ft/s (380 m/s) making it an adequate round for hunting some medium game at close distances.

For practical shooting competitors, the .400 Corbon makes IPSC Major Power Factor of 175 and surpasses the IDPA Enhanced Service Pistol's Power Floor of 125,000 in most loads using a 5-inch barrel. The .400 Corbon also surpasses the Steel Challenge Shooting Association's stop plate's power actor floor of 120 and qualifies for metallic silhouette Big Bore Competition under IHMSA rules.

According to Ed Sanow, the 135 gr (8.7 g). JHP penetrated 9 inches (230 mm) of ordnance gelatin and "equals the predicted stopping power of the 10mm 135-grain (8.7 g) JHP loads," and that the 165 gr (10.7 g). JHP "penetrates an ideal 12.3 inches (310 mm) of gelatin" and "should be a 92-percent stopper, per the Fuller Index."

== Ammunition and handloading ==
Factory-made ammunition is available from Cor-Bon in a variety of bullet weights and types: 115 gr (7.5 g) Glaser Safety Slugs; 155 gr (10.0 g) DPX; 135 gr (8.7 g) Pow'RBall; 130, 150, and 165 gr (10.7 g) tradition JHPs; and 165 gr (10.7 g) Performance Match; and is sold by major mail-order retailers.

Many shooters, however, handload their own ammunition to save money. Fired .45 ACP cases can be resized and trimmed to handload .400 Corbon cartridges. New brass cases are manufactured by Starline Brass and are readily available directly from them and major mail order retailers. According to Starline Brass, "The primer pocket was changed from large pistol primer to small pistol/rifle primer in 12/00. Test results concluded no adverse affect [sic] from switching to small primer pocket. Cor-Bon is now recommending Win. small pistol works best and if using small rifle Remington 7 1/2 works the best."

Lee Precision, Inc. offers a .400 Corbon 3-Die set. Redding Reloading, according to their catalog, offers custom made 3-die sets for the .400 Corbon. Lubricating of the bottleneck case can be avoided when starting with .400 Corbon cases by using a carbide .45 ACP sizing die before using the .400 Corbon sizing die. Using a five-stage progressive reloading press makes this less of a chore.

Setback of the bullet in the case—which can cause excessive pressure—can be avoided by using a tight roll crimp and, if necessary, Corbin's Hand Cannelure Tool for jacketed bullets. Since the cartridge headspaces on the shoulder rather than the case mouth, a tight crimp will not cause headspace problems.

Information on handloads for the .400 Corbon can be found online.

== Handguns and conversions ==
Les Baer offers both his Baer 1911 Premier II 5" and Premier II Super-Tac pistols either in .400 Corbon or as a .400 Corbon and .45 ACP dual caliber combination.

Nearly any .45 ACP pistol can be converted to utilize the .400 Cor-Bon cartridge with only a drop-in replacement barrel, and sometimes a heavier recoil spring (for 1911s this is usually an 18-20 lb. spring, although a few need a 22–24 lb. spring). Suitable recoil springs are easily installed when changing barrels and readily available from many gun parts suppliers, including Wolff Gunsprings. There is no need to buy new magazines, guide rods, or change extractors. Feed reliability with this cartridge improves with very stiff magazine springs, particularly in 1911 style pistols, as too light a magazine spring can cause nose dive jams when the magazine is fully loaded.

Because the .400 Corbon operates at much lower pressures than the 10mm, modern 1911s are able to be converted to it without the cracked frames and slide rails that were problems with the 10mm Colt Delta Elite. Since a .400 Corbon conversion virtually matches the performance of the 10mm yet does not need of purchasing another Handgun, some call it the "poor man's 10 mm". Plus, the one can easily switching back to .45 ACP whenever you desire.

As Gun & Ammo wrote,

The .400 Cor-Bon is one of the more useful of the current crop of .45 ACP offspring. There are faster rounds, but the .400 Cor-Bon is simply easy to get along with. You don't need extra-heavy springs or tricked-out guns for this round -- just drop a .400 Cor-Bon barrel in your favorite .45 and you are good to go.

As of July 4, 2008, the following companies offer .400 Corbon conversion barrels: Clark Custom Guns offers drop-in standard and compensated barrels for 1911s; EFK Fire Dragon offers them for 1911s, Glocks, Sig 200, HK USP, and the Springfield XD; Jarvis Inc. offers them for 1911s; King's Gun Works also offers them for 1911s; and Les Baer offers them for 1911s in National Match grade in 5" and 6-inch barrel lengths. Bar-Sto no longer offers them.

== See also ==
- 10 mm caliber
- List of handgun cartridges
