= Desert Eagle =

IMI Desert Eagle
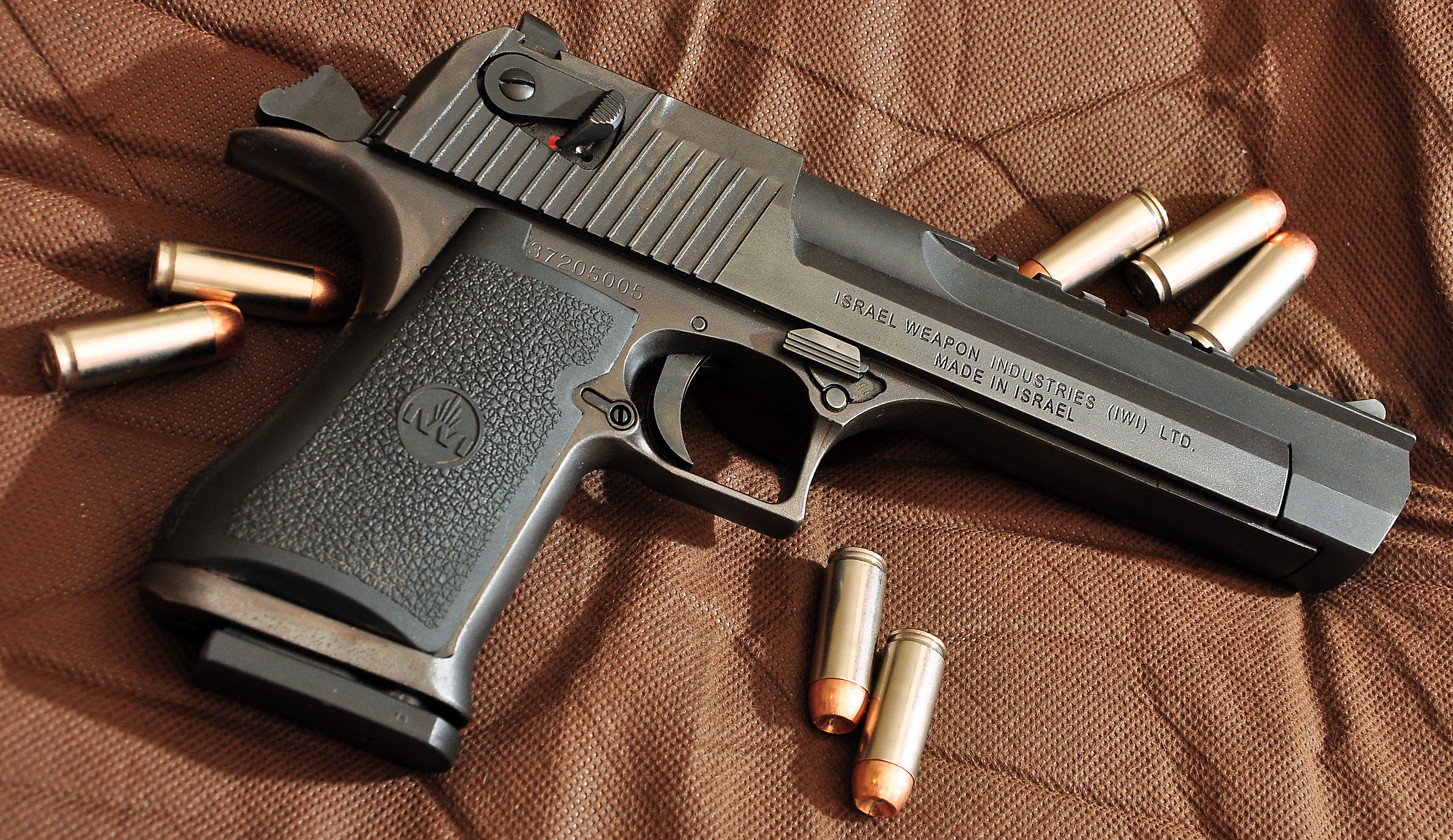
- IMI Desert Eagle .50 Action Express
- Type: Semi-automatic pistol
- Place of origin: Israel / United States

Production history
- Designer: Magnum Research and Israel Military Industries
- Designed: 1979–1982
- Manufacturer: Israel Military Industries, Saco Defense, Magnum Research and Israel Weapon Industries, Magnum Research
- Produced: 1983–present
- Variants: See: § Variants

Specifications
- Mass: Mark VII: 3.9 lb (1,769.0 g) (.357 Magnum); 4.2 lb (1,905.1 g) (.44 Magnum); Mark XIX: 4.4 lb (1,995.8 g)
- Length: Mark VII: 10.6 in (269.2 mm) (6 in barrel); Mark XIX: 10.75 in (273.1 mm) (6 in barrel); 14.75 in (374.6 mm) (10 in barrel)
- Barrel length: 6 in (152.4 mm), 10 in (254.0 mm)
- Width: 1.25 in (31.8 mm)
- Height: 6.25 in (158.8 mm)
- Cartridge: .50 Action Express; .44 Magnum; .440 Cor-Bon; .429 DE; .41 Magnum; .357 Magnum; .357/44 Bain & Davis (IMI prototype only)
- Action: Gas-operated, closed rotating bolt
- Muzzle velocity: 1542 ft/s (470 m/s) (.50 AE)
- Maximum firing range: 201 meters (220 yd)
- Feed system: Detachable box magazine; capacities: 9 rounds (.357); 8 rounds (.41, .44, and .50); 7 rounds (.429 DE, .440 Cor-Bon, and .50 AE)
- Sights: Iron sights and optional optics

The Desert Eagle, also known as the Deagle, is a single-action, gas-operated, semi-automatic pistol capable of chambering the .50 Action Express, the largest centerfire cartridge of any magazine-fed, self-loading pistol, and a number of other high-powered cartridges.

Magnum Research Inc. (MRI) designed and developed the Desert Eagle. The design was further refined (and was also manufactured) by Israel Military Industries (IMI), until 1995, when MRI shifted the manufacturing contract to Saco Defense, in Saco, Maine. In 1998, MRI moved manufacturing back to IMI, which later commercialized its small arms branch under the name Israel Weapon Industries. Since December 2009, the Desert Eagle pistol has been produced in the United States at MRI's Pillager, Minnesota, facility. Kahr Arms acquired Magnum Research in 2010.

Magnum Research has marketed various versions of the short recoil Jericho 941 pistol under the Baby Eagle and Desert Eagle pistol names; these weapons are not directly related to the Desert Eagle, but share a similar visual design.

== Design ==
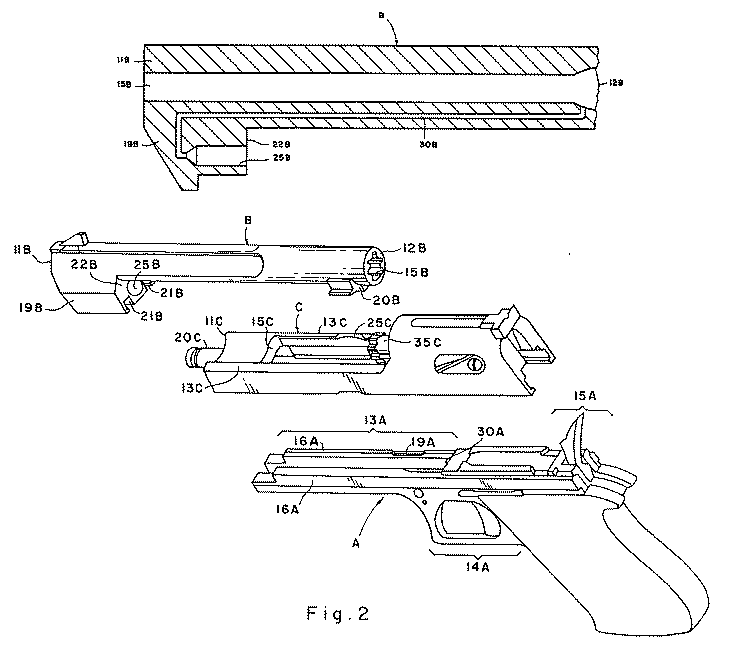
Drawings from patent 4,619,184 showing the Desert Eagle's gas-operated mechanism

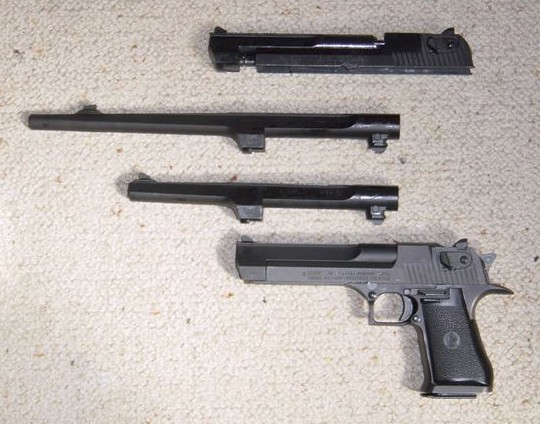
Interchangeable barrels for a Desert Eagle Mark I

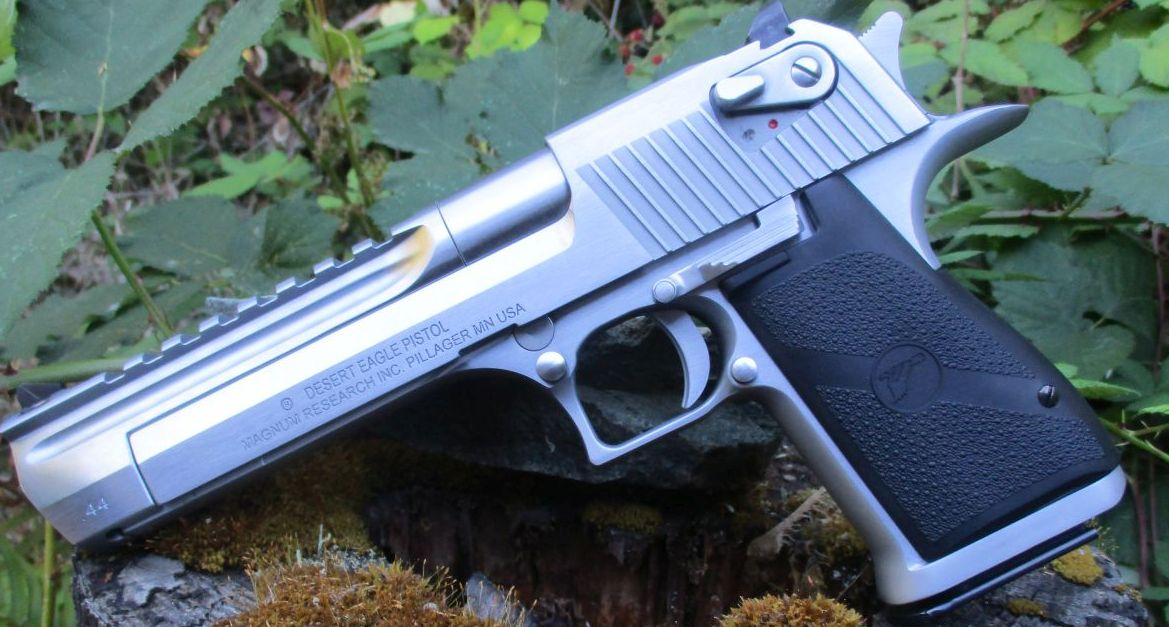
Desert Eagle, Mark XIX in .44 Magnum

The design for the Desert Eagle was initiated by Bernard C. White of Magnum Research who filed a U.S. patent application for a mechanism for a gas-actuated pistol in January 1983. This established the basic layout of the Desert Eagle. A second patent application was filed in December 1985, after the basic design had been refined by IMI Systems (Israel Military Industries) for production, and this is the form that went into production.

The pistol is fired by a single-action hammer and has a manual safety switch on the slide. The ambidextrous safety switch rotates a drum mechanism that sits over the firing pin, causing the firing pin to lock in, which prevents it from moving forward and reduces the possibility of the gun discharging accidentally. With the safety off, pulling the trigger releases the hammer, allowing it to fall downward and strike the firing pin, causing the chambered round to discharge.

The Desert Eagle uses a gas-operated ejection and chambering mechanism normally found in rifles, as opposed to the short recoil or blowback designs most commonly seen in semi-automatic pistols. When a round is fired, gases are ported out through a small hole in the barrel in front of the chamber. These travel forward through a small tube under the barrel, to a cylinder underneath the front of the barrel. The slide, which acts as the bolt carrier, has a small piston on the front that fits into this cylinder. When the gases reach the cylinder, the piston pushes the slide rearward, with a large pin inside the camming surface in the rear of the bolt causing the bolt to rotate and unlock. A mechanism on the left side of the bolt prevents the bolt from rotating freely as the slide moves, forcing it to remain aligned correctly with the barrel while the breech is open. The spring-loaded ejector is continually being depressed by the case, until the case is free of the chamber and the tension from the ejector is released, causing the case to eject, breaking free of the extractor in the process. The slide reaches its rearmost position, and then moves forward again under the tension of the recoil springs. The bottom lug of the bolt pushes a new round into the chamber, then the bolt locks up and the gun can be fired again.

The rotating bolt has three radial locking lugs (the fourth lug is only for pushing the next round into the chamber), with the extractor on the right-hand side fitting where the fifth lug would be, and strongly resembles the seven-lug bolt of the M16 series of rifles, while the fixed gas cylinder and moving piston resemble those of the Ruger Mini-14 carbine (the original patent used a captive piston similar to the M14 rifle).

The advantage of the gas operation is that it allows the use of far more powerful cartridges than traditional semi-automatic pistol designs. Thus, it allows the Desert Eagle to compete in an area that had previously been dominated by magnum revolvers. Downsides of the gas-operated mechanism are the large size of the Desert Eagle, and the fact that it discourages the use of unjacketed lead bullets, as lead particles sheared off during firing can clog the gas release tap, preventing proper function.

Switching a Desert Eagle to another chambering requires only that the correct barrel, bolt assembly, and magazine be installed. Thus, a conversion to fire other cartridges can be quickly accomplished. Because the rim diameter of the .50 AE (Action Express) is the same as that of the .44 Remington Magnum cartridge, only a barrel and magazine change is required to convert a .44 Desert Eagle to the larger, more powerful .50 AE round. The most popular barrel length is 6 in (152 mm), although a 10 in (254 mm) barrel is available. The Mark XIX barrels are machined with integral scope mounting bases, simplifying the process of adding a pistol scope.

The Desert Eagle is fed with a detachable magazine. Magazine capacity is nine rounds in .357 Magnum, eight rounds in .44 Magnum, and seven rounds in .50 Action Express. The Desert Eagle's barrel features polygonal rifling. The pistol is primarily used for hunting, target shooting, and silhouette shooting.

== Variants ==
=== Marks I and VII ===
The Mark I, which is no longer produced, was offered with a steel, stainless steel, or aluminum alloy frame and differs primarily in the size and shape of the safety levers and slide catch. The Mark VII includes an adjustable trigger (retrofittable to Mark I pistols). The Mark I and VII are both available in .357 Magnum and .44 Magnum; the Mark VII has been chambered for .41 Magnum. The barrels have a 3/8 in dovetail, to which an accessory mount can be attached. Later Mark VII models were offered in .50 Action Express with a 7/8 in Weaver-pattern rail on the barrel; the .50 Mark VII later became the Mark XIX. Barrel lengths are 6, 10, and 14 inches for .357 Magnum and .44 Magnum, but only 6 or 10 inches for .41 Magnum.

=== Mark XIX ===
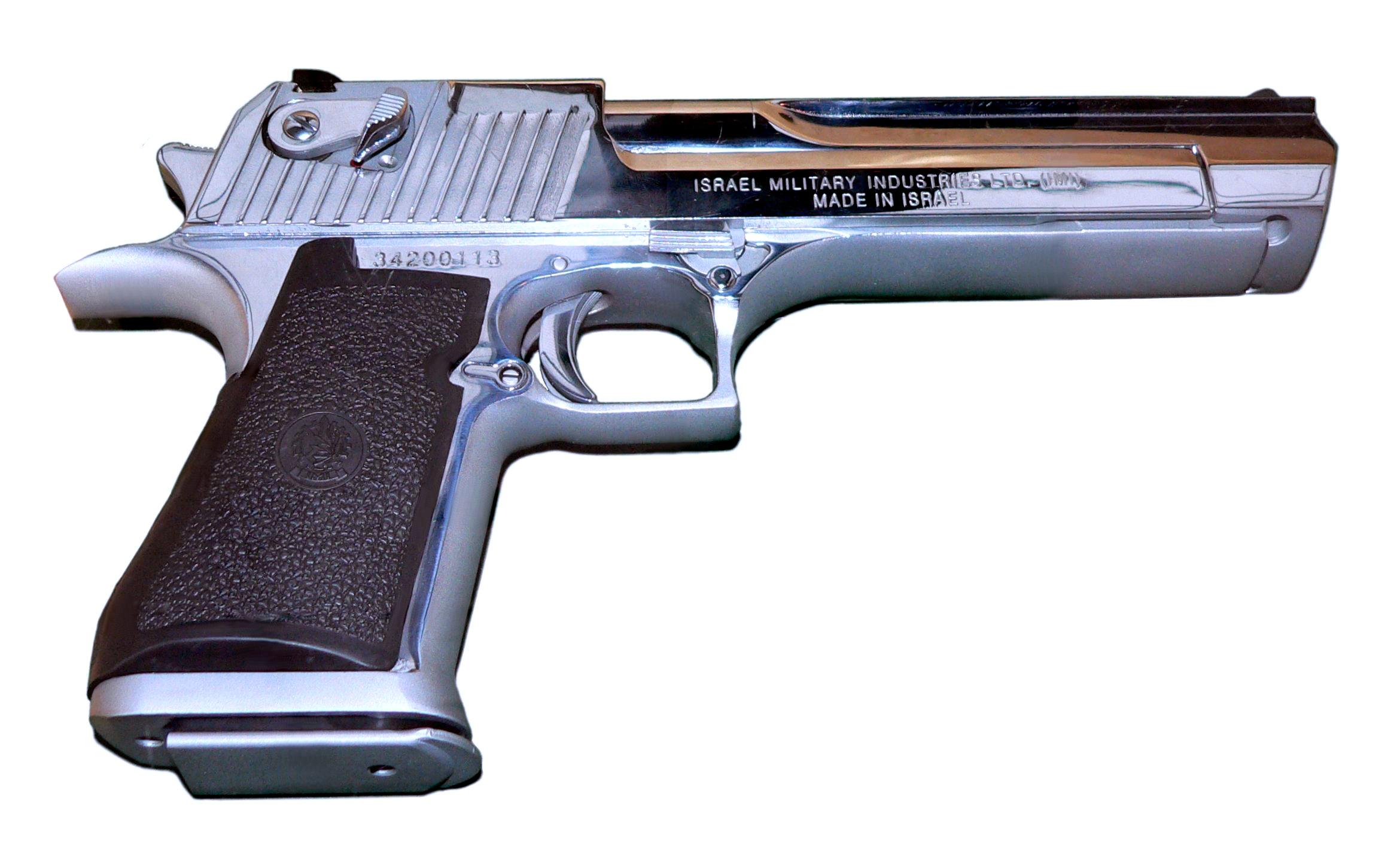
Desert Eagle Mark XIX in .50 AE

The most recent model, the Mark XIX, is available in .357 Magnum, .44 Magnum, .429 DE (introduced in 2018), and .50 Action Express. This model comes in a variety of different finishes, such as brushed chrome or titanium gold. Magnum Research offered this model in .440 Cor-Bon caliber, a .50 AE-derived case. There were fewer than 500 original .440 Cor-Bon Desert Eagles imported into the U.S. in December 2000. These are marked by the number 440 on the left lower side of the barrel, in numerals twice the size of other calibers, and without the preceding period. A number of .44 Magnum barrels were re-chambered to produce .440 Cor-Bon barrels, but these can be identified by the off-centered ".440" (with period) produced by adding the final 0 to the original barrel mark.

Mark XIX barrels are available in 6-inch (150 mm) and 10-inch (250 mm) lengths only. All .357 Magnum barrels have exterior barrel flutes on the left, right, and top sides of the barrel. All .44 Magnum barrels have flutes on the left and right sides only, not on the top. The .50 AE barrels have no flutes.

All current-production Mark XIX models (except for the California-approved models) have Weaver rails along the top of the barrels, as opposed to the Dovetail rails on previous models. Selected Mark XIX models have ported barrels or under-barrel picatinny rails.

The DE44CA (Desert Eagle .44 Magnum California) is the only Mark XIX model approved for dealer sales to the public in the State of California. The California-approved version differs from the regular XIX models in that it has an automatic firing pin block and a two-slot Weaver-style rail for mounting optics.

The L6 and L5 is an lighter weight, aluminum frame variants of the Mark XIX. the differences between the L6 and L5 is the barrel length (i.e, L6 is 6"barrel and L5 is 5"barrel). they come in .50 AE, .44 Magum and .357 Magum.

== In popular culture ==
The Desert Eagle has been featured in more than 600 films, television shows, and video games, making it well known in popular culture. The commercial success of the pistol is due in part to its use in films, according to Magnum Research chairman and CEO John Risdall. According to a 1994 newspaper article, the company actively solicited prop houses to use the gun. By 2000, it had been used in over 40 films, including The Matrix, Snatch, Eraser, Red Heat, Last Action Hero, Cliffhanger, Demolition Man, Assassins, Commando, The Last Boy Scout, Double Impact, and Austin Powers.

== Users ==
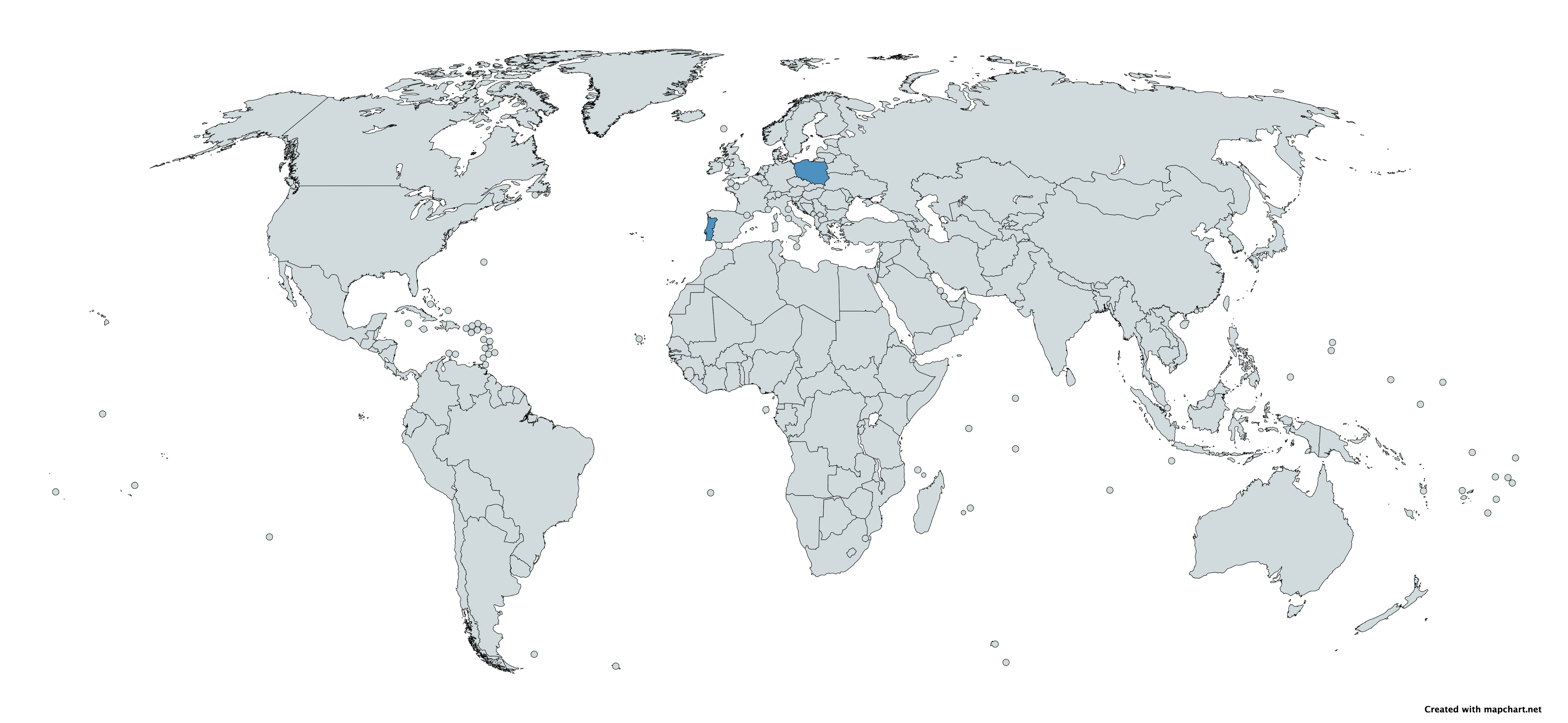
A map with Desert Eagle users in blue

- Poland: GROM Military Unit
- Portugal: GOE
