= Glaser Safety Slug =

Type of frangible bullet

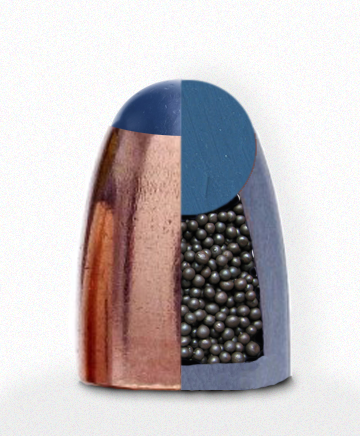
Artist's depiction of the inside of the Glaser Safety Slug.

Glaser Safety Slug is a frangible bullet made by Cor-Bon/Glaser, a subsidiary of Dakota Ammo, an American ammunition company formerly based in Sturgis, South Dakota. The Glaser Safety Slug was developed by Jack Canon in 1975, the same year the company was founded by Armin Glaser.

== History ==
The original round was a hand-made hollow-point bullet filled with No. 12 birdshot (0.05 in (1.3 mm)) with a flat polymer cap. To improve ballistic performance, a polymer-tipped round ball was introduced in 1987, and the current compressed core form was first sold in 1988. The formulation of the polymer was also changed in 1994 to improve fragmentation reliability.

== Performance ==
The company produces bullets in calibers from .25 to .45 for pistols and from .223 to .30-06 for rifles. Each caliber comes in two forms, "blue" and "silver", the latter having greater penetrating power due to the use of no. 6 birdshot rather than no. 12.

The projectile in the cartridge is of a lighter weight than more conventional types of cartridges and so the projectiles exit the bore at significantly higher muzzle velocities. The current bullet has a stable core of compressed lead shot. On impact, the bullet fractures along manufactured stress lines in the jacket—imparting all the bullet's energy very quickly rather than over-penetrating a target or ricocheting on a miss. The light weight and fragility of the projectile make it unsuitable for open field long-range firing or against heavily guarded targets.

The bullet design can produce deep wounds while failing to pass through structural barriers thicker than drywall or sheet metal. These qualities make it less likely to strike unintended targets (for example, bystanders in another room) during indoor combat. Also, when it strikes a hard surface from which a solid bullet would glance off, it fragments into tiny light pieces, creating less ricochet danger.

== Cultural reference ==
- This is the type of ammunition that has been used in the Season 1, Episode 5 "Hello from space, my Dear" of Scarpetta (TV series)
- Will Graham uses this ammunition in Thomas Harris's Red Dragon (novel) after a previous experience when standard 0.38 pistol rounds failed to down an adversary rapidly.

== See also ==
- Gold Dot
- Hydra-Shok
- Hollow-base bullet
- Urban warfare
