= Freedom Arms Model 83 .500 WE =

Model 83 .500 WE
- Type: Revolver
- Place of origin: United States

Production history
- Designer: Dick Casull
- Designed: 1950s
- Manufacturer: Freedom Arms

Specifications
- Mass: 51 oz (3.2 lb)
- Barrel length: 4.75 in (121 mm), 6 in (150 mm), or 7.5 in (190 mm)
- Cartridge: .500 Wyoming Express
- Action: Single-action
- Muzzle velocity: 1,300 ft/s (396 m/s) with 420 gr (27 g) projectile
- Feed system: 5-round cylinder
- Sights: Rear square notch, front blade

Model 83 .500 WE is a single action revolver manufactured by Freedom Arms chambered for the .500 Wyoming Express round. In the 1986 film Armed and Dangerous, John Candy brandishes a Freedom Arms Model 83 chambered in .454 Casull (with scope), claiming it's "a .50 caliber," designed for "hunting buffalo...up close." Candy adds that the firearm is only legal in two states, and "this [California] ain't one of them."

Nate Romanowski - a continuing character in the C. J. Box series of “Joe Pickett” books - falconer and former special forces - carries a model 83 chambered in .454 Casull which he shoots with uncanny accuracy and without an electronic sight. Later in the series, he begins to carry a model 83 chambered in 500 Wyoming express, noting that the heavier projectile recoils more smoothly and tends to pass through a target, lessening the chance of a forensics team finding the projectile.
