= .500 Wyoming Express =

.50 caliber revolver cartridge

- Type: Revolver
- Place of origin: United States

Production history
- Designer: Freedom Arms
- Designed: 2005
- Manufacturer: Freedom Arms
- Produced: 2005–present

Specifications
- Case type: Belted straight
- Bullet diameter: .500 in (12.7 mm)
- Base diameter: .525 in (13.3 mm)
- Rim diameter: .543 in (13.8 mm)
- Case length: 1.37 in (35 mm)
- Overall length: 1.765 in (44.8 mm)
- Rifling twist: 1:20
- Primer type: Large rifle
- Maximum pressure: 50,000 psi

Ballistic performance
| Bullet mass/type | Velocity | Energy |
|---|---|---|
| 325 gr (21 g) X-Treme | 1,250 ft/s (380 m/s) | 1,127 ft⋅lbf (1,528 J) |
| 410 gr (27 g) Bengal WFNGC | 1,500 ft/s (460 m/s) | 2,048 ft⋅lbf (2,777 J) |
| 520 gr (34 g) Bengal WFNGC | 1,200 ft/s (370 m/s) | 1,663 ft⋅lbf (2,255 J) |
- Test barrel length: 7.5; Source: https://tiiarmory.com/ammunition

The .500 Wyoming Express or .500 WE is a "big bore" handgun cartridge. Freedom Arms introduced the cartridge in 2005 for their Model 83 .500 WE revolver.

Like most handgun cartridges of this size, it is used almost exclusively in revolvers. It is designed mainly for hunting and wilderness defense against medium to heavy North American game.

== Overview ==
The .500 Wyoming Express is dimensionally similar to the .50 Action Express but can be loaded to a higher power level and utilize heavier bullets, due to its greater maximum chamber pressure and longer cartridge overall length. Unique among handgun cartridges, it is a belted round, which allows for a heavy roll crimp to be employed without compromising headspace, unlike the .50 AE. Though not as powerful as the .500 S&W Magnum, the .500 Wyoming Express is available in more compact revolvers, and for those capable of mastering its heavy recoil, it is adequate for harvesting any North American game animal at short to moderate range. Conceptually similar cartridges include the .500 Linebaugh, .500 JRH, .475 Linebaugh, and .454 Casull. However, the .500 Wyoming Express is somewhat more powerful than these rounds. It is ballistically comparable to the .500 Maximum, 50-70 Government, and .50 Beowulf cartridges, which are usually chambered in substantially larger firearms.

While .500 Wyoming Express brass was out of production for several years, it is currently available from TII Armory, along with loading dies and ammunition.

== See also ==
- List of handgun cartridges
- 12 mm caliber
