= North American Arms =

American arms company

- Type: Pocket Pistols and revolvers
- Industry: Firearms
- Predecessor: Rocky Mountain Arms
- Founded: 1972; 54 years ago
- Fate: Active
- Headquarters: Provo, Utah, United States
- Products: Pocket pistols
- Owner: Employee Owned
- Website: North American Arms

North American Arms is a United States company, headquartered in Provo, Utah, that manufactures pocket pistols and mini-revolvers, also called mouse guns. The company was originally named Rocky Mountain Arms when it was founded in 1972. In 1974 it was bought by new owners who renamed the company North American Manufacturing (NAM) and then North American Arms (NAA).

== Mini-revolvers ==
=== Bicycle guns ===
Hopkins and Allen produced a "7-shot .22 solid frame double action revolver, made between 1875 and 1907, known as the XL No. 3 Double Action small frame. The .32 Smith & Wesson Safety Hammerless of 1888 to 1892 with the 2 inch barrel became known as a 'Bicycle' gun at some point, and the First Model Ladysmith (the 1902 M Frame Model .22 Hand Ejector), was often referred to as a 'Bicycle' gun. Iver Johnson made a similar gun—the Model 1900 Double Action small frame, a 7-shot .22, which appeared in 1900 and remained in production for 41 years."

=== North American Arms ===
The mini-revolvers produced by the company are five-shot, single-action revolvers, which have a spur trigger design. They are reminiscent of late 19th-century pocket revolvers, the main differences being their size and also that NAA's mini-revolvers are made completely of stainless steel. The design of the mini-revolvers was developed by Freedom Arms, which stopped selling these mini-revolvers in 1990 and then sold the design to North American Arms.

In 1978, Dick Casull became a partner of Wayne Baker in the Freedom, Wyoming-based Freedom Arms firearms manufacturing business to produce a 5-shot mini revolver in .22 LR known as "The Patriot", later offered in .22 Short and .22 WMR, also a mini double action revolver, the Casull CA-2000 Mini. A 4-shot mini revolver was also produced by Freedom Arms. The production of mini-revolvers by Freedom Arms ceased in 1990. Casull was granted U.S. Patent 4385463 in 1983 for a floating firing pin for mini revolvers and U.S. Patent 4450992 in 1984 for a belt buckle holster that would hold a mini revolver. The mini-revolver design was sold to North American Arms.

The company manufactures revolvers in the following calibers:

- .22 Short
- .22 Long Rifle
- .22 Winchester Magnum Rimfire
- .22 Black powder cap and ball

The cylinder must be removed from the frame to load or unload all NAA mini-revolvers, with the exception of two models, the "Sidewinder" (swing-out cylinder) and "Ranger II" (break-open cylinder).

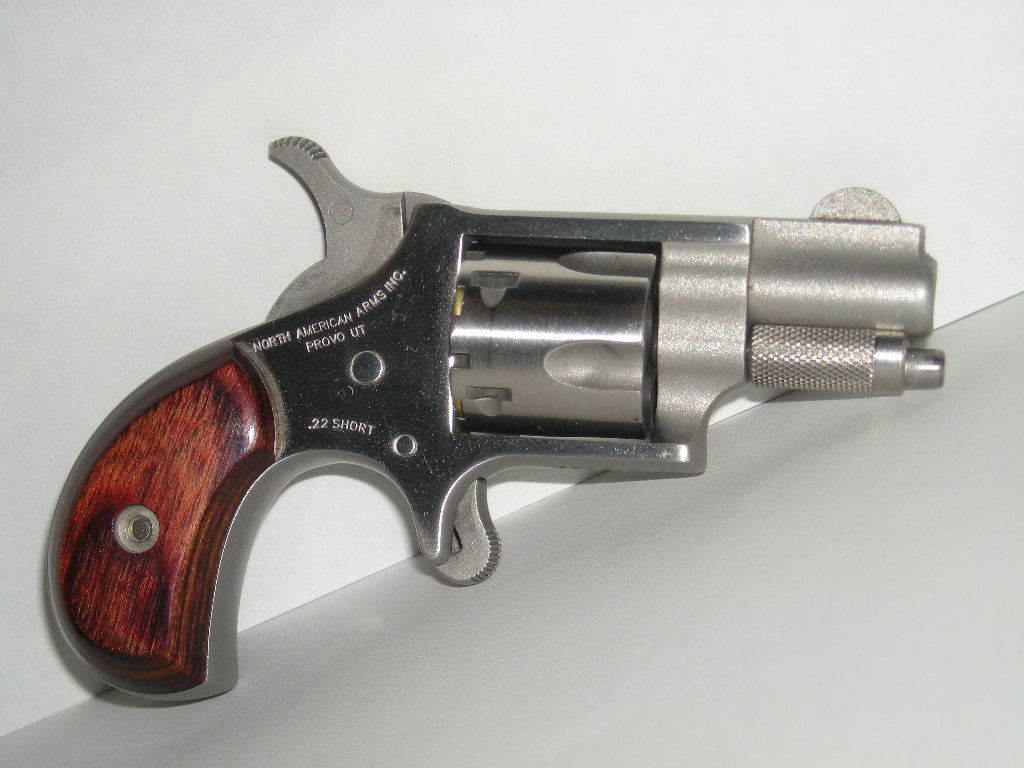
North American Arms model NAA22S mini-revolver, chambered in .22 Short.

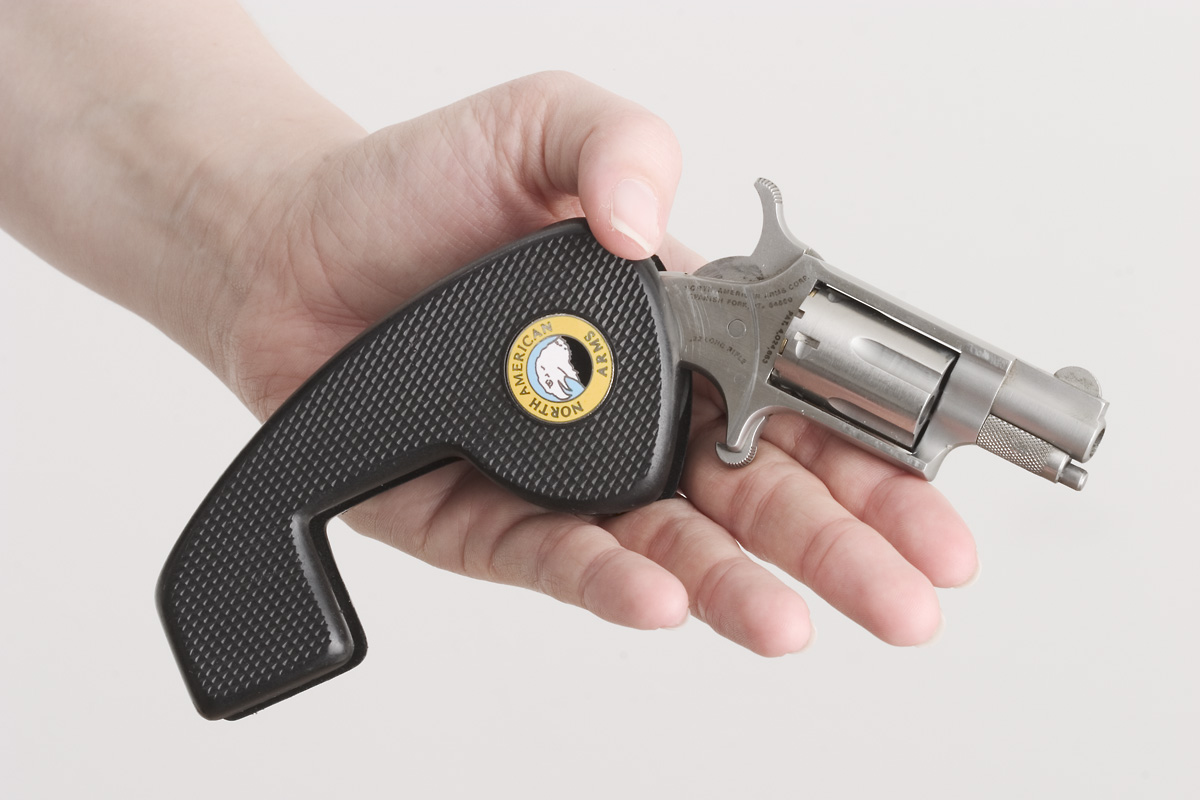
NAA mini revolver in .22 LR. It can fold into its own grip for safe belt clip carry.

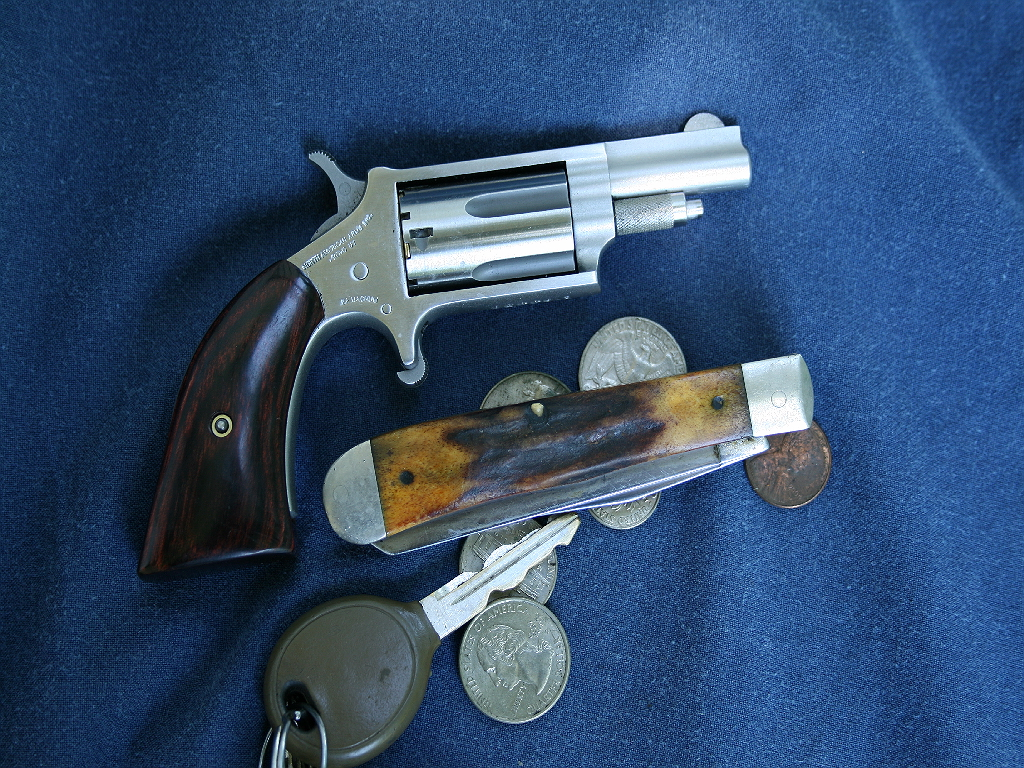
The .22 M- A .22 Winchester Magnum Rimfire revolver equipped with "Boot Grips".

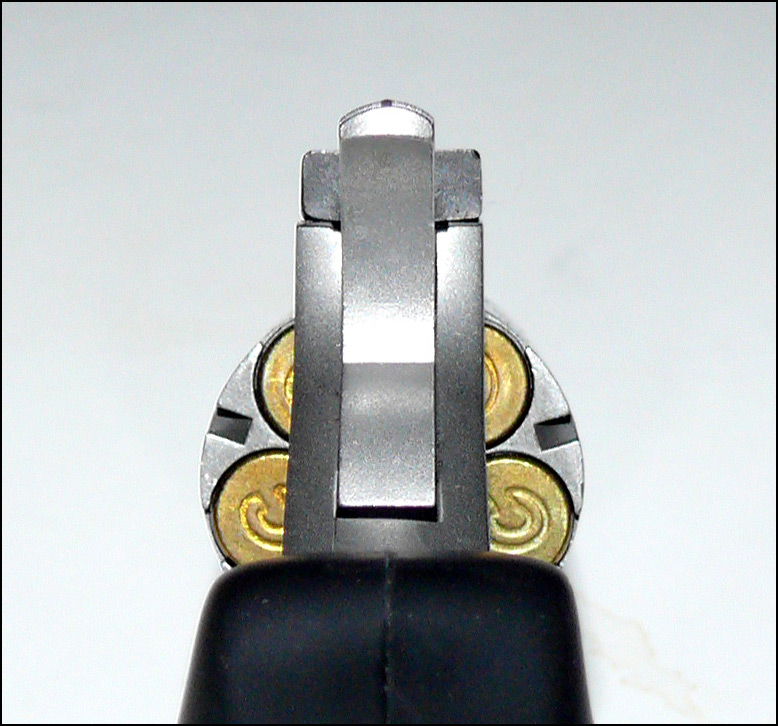
This picture illustrates the NAA .22 Magnum Black Widow revolver cylinder in the safety position.

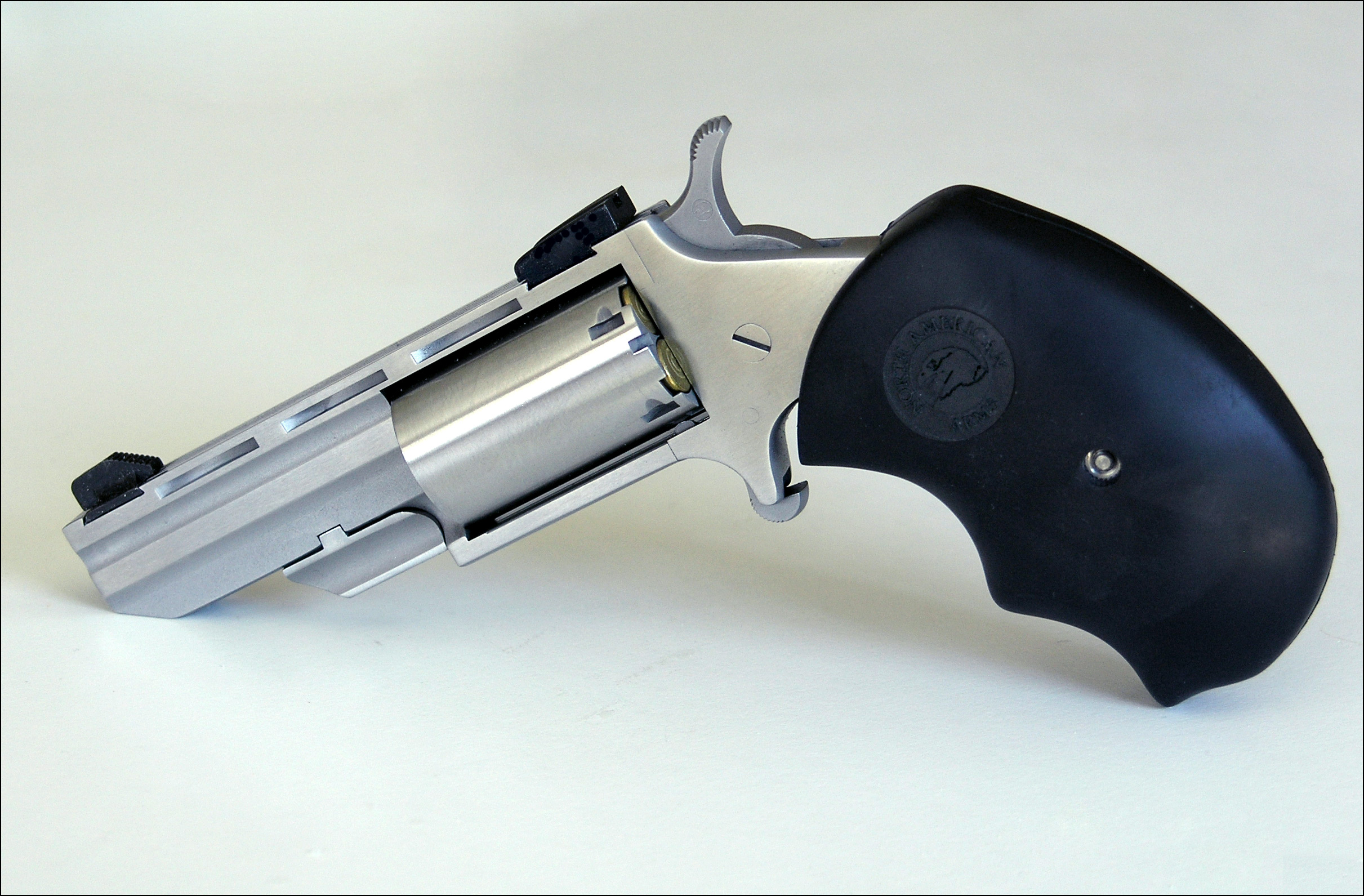
North American Arms Black Widow model NAA-BW-M chambered for .22 Magnum.

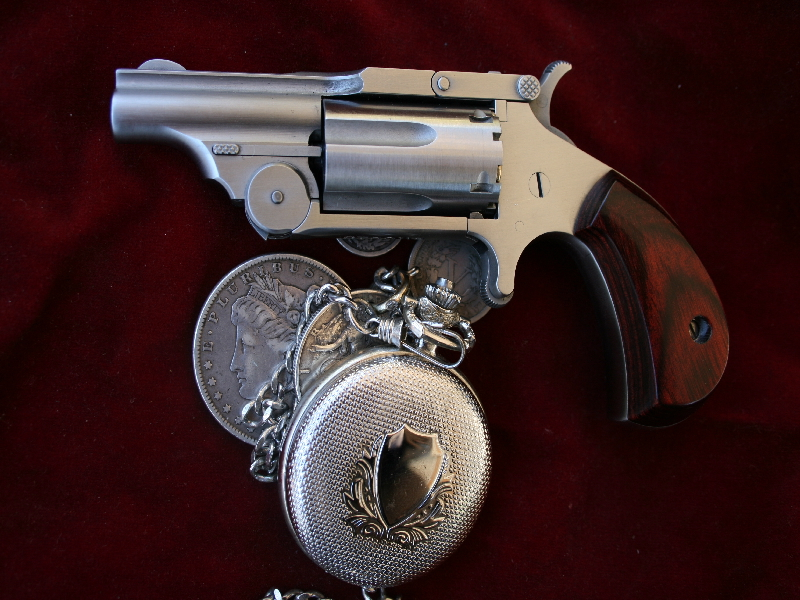
The top break "Ranger" came from a limited tool room run.

== Semi-automatics ==
NAA Guardian in .32 NAA.

In 1997 NAA branched out into semiautomatic concealed carry pistols known as the Guardian models to compete with Seecamp. Semi-automatic Guardian pistols are made by North American Arms in the following calibers:

- .25 NAA
- .32 ACP
- .32 NAA
- .380 ACP

The .25 NAA cartridge was developed by North American Arms based upon a wildcat bottleneck cartridge using .32 ACP brass necked down to grip a .25 caliber bullet, with the goal of increasing penetration beyond what either a .25 ACP or .32 ACP could do. Likewise, the .32 NAA was developed by North American Arms to increase the penetration of a .32 caliber bullet relative to a .380 ACP cartridge.
