= Cor-Bon/Glaser =

American ammunition manufacturer

Corbon Inc.
- Type: Private
- Industry: firearms
- Founded: 1982; 44 years ago
- Founder: Peter Pi, Sr.
- Fate: takeover (after bankruptcy in November, 2017)
- Headquarters: Grafton, Ohio, U.S.
- Products: ammunition
- Website: corbon.com

Cor-Bon/Glaser LLC is a manufacturer of small arms ammunition.

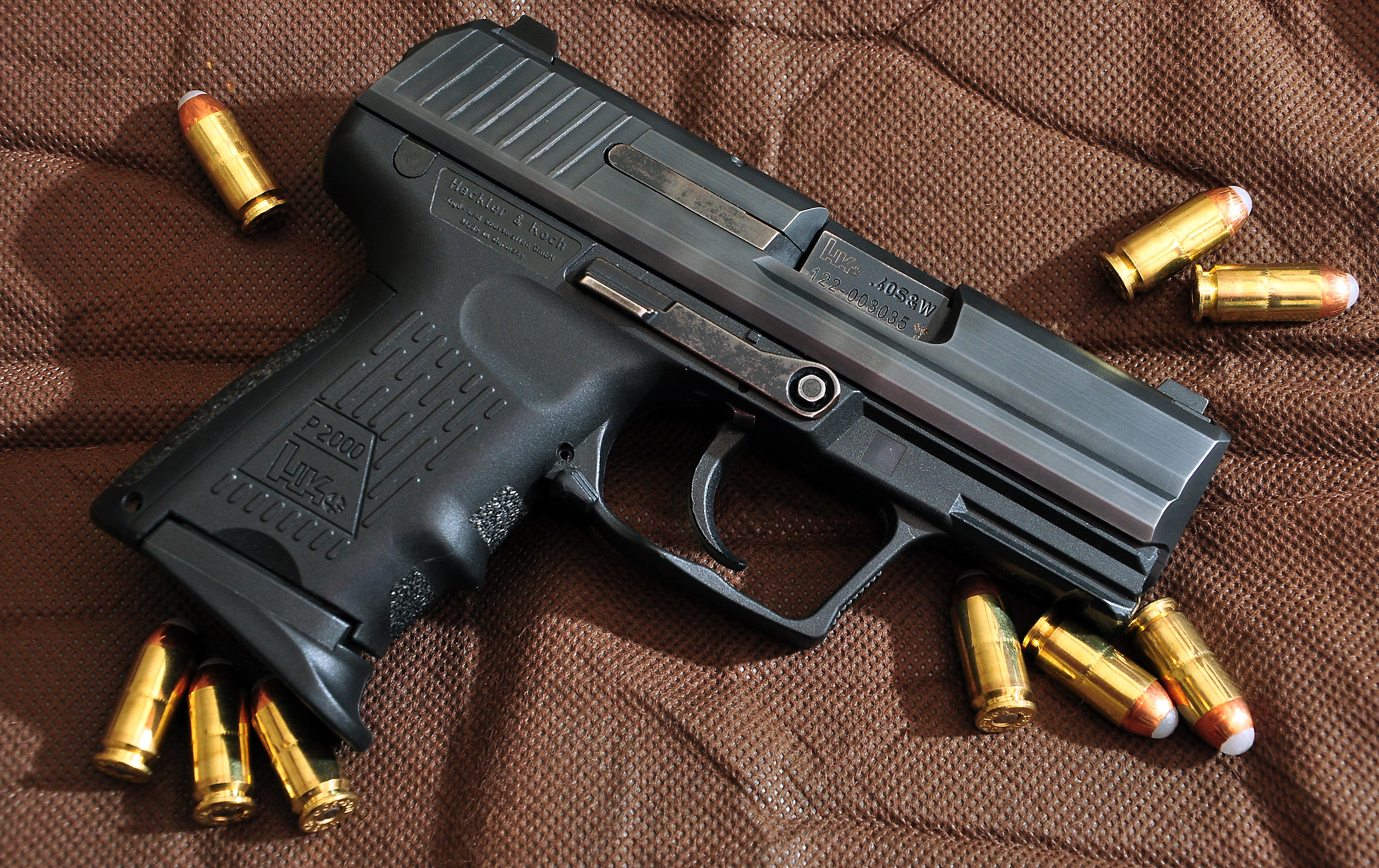
HK2000 with Glaser Powerball Ammunition

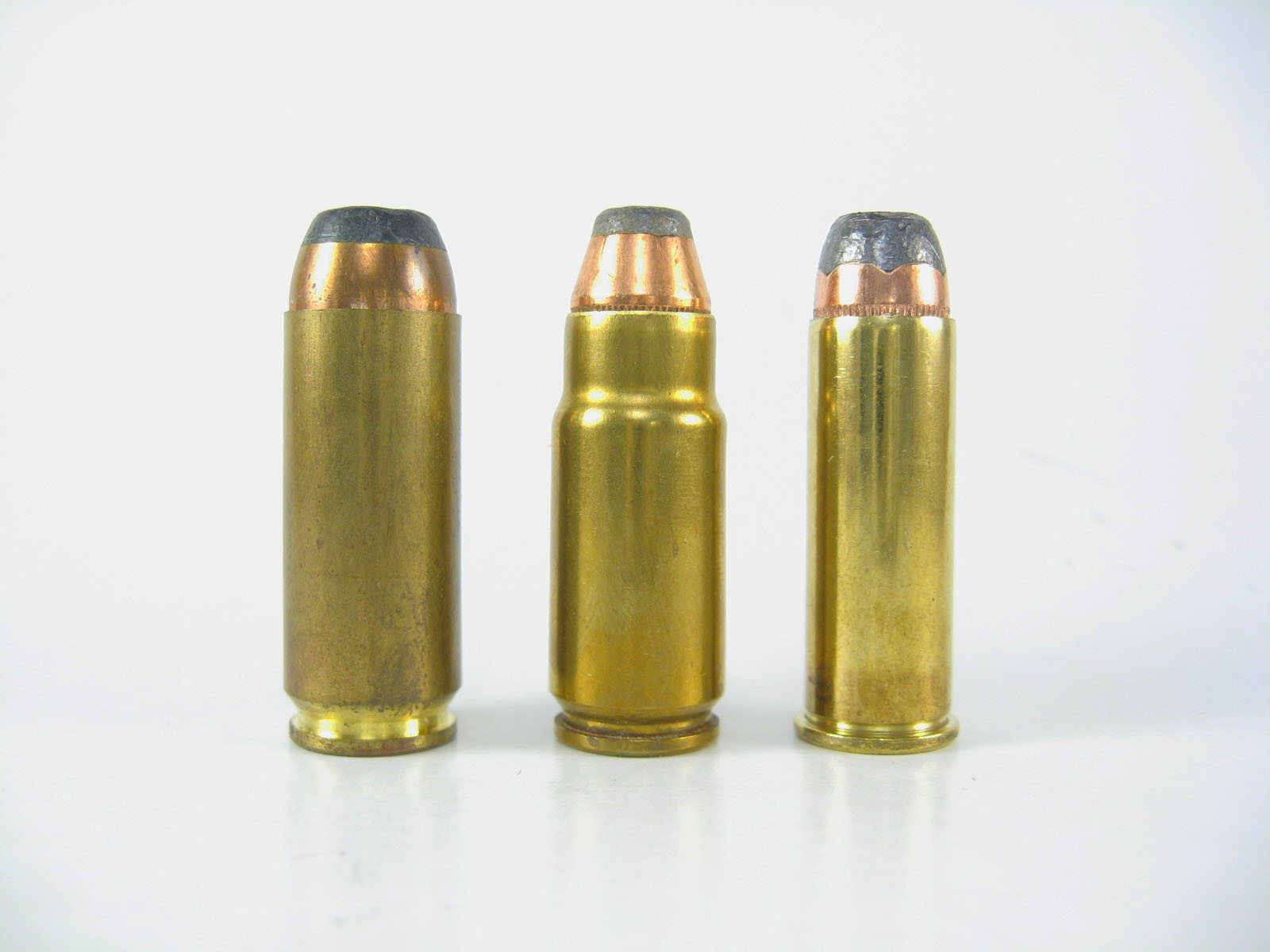
.50 Action Express, .440 Cor-Bon, .44 Rem Magnum

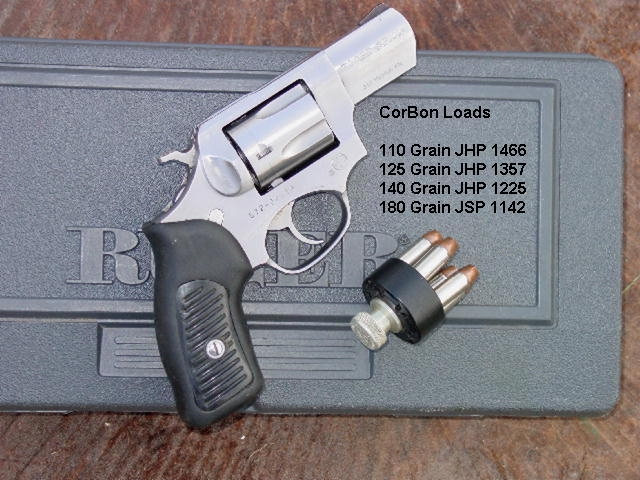
Ruger SP101, with Cor-Bon Ammunition

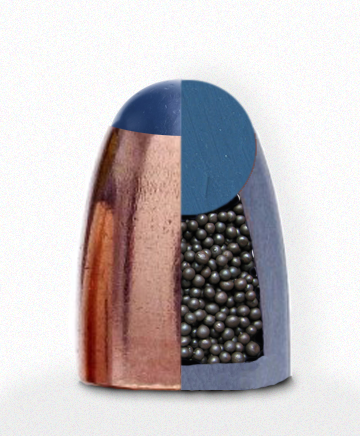
Glaser Bullet Construction

== History ==
Founded in Detroit, Michigan, Cor-Bon/Glaser Ammunition originated when Peter Pi Sr. started making handgun hunting ammo in 1982 because the commonly available ammunition at that time was performing poorly. Pi noticed that hollow point ammunition would not expand and went about creating a line of ammunition with reliable expansion.

In 2017 the Company was sold to TA Perrine and moved to Wooster, OH.

In 2021 the company was sold again to an investment group out of Sandusky, OH,

== CorBon Law Enforcement Training Center ==
On June 23, 2011 the company opened the CorBon Law Enforcement Training Center (CLETC) in Sturgis, South Dakota. The center has several shooting ranges to train law enforcement officers. CLETC closed in 2015 due to a lack of business.

== Product Lines ==
Cor-bon produces several product lines of ammunition:

- Original JHP
- DPX
- Performance Match
- Urban Response
- Hunting Lines
- Multi-Purpose Rifle
- Subsonic Ammo

Glaser Safety Slug has several product lines:

- Powerball
- Safety Slug Blue
- Safety Slug Silver

=== Original Products ===
Cor-Bon designed and developed the .32 NAA, essentially a .380 ACP case necked-down to a .32 caliber bullet, and the NAA Guardian .32 NAA pocket pistol in partnership with North American Arms (NAA). At the 2004 SHOT Show, Cor-Bon and NAA introduced their jointly developed .25 NAA.

.400 Cor-Bon is a Cor-Bon cartridge that was developed in 1997. In the same manner as the .32 NAA, it was based on a .45 ACP case necked-down to .40.
