= Smith & Wesson Model 57 =

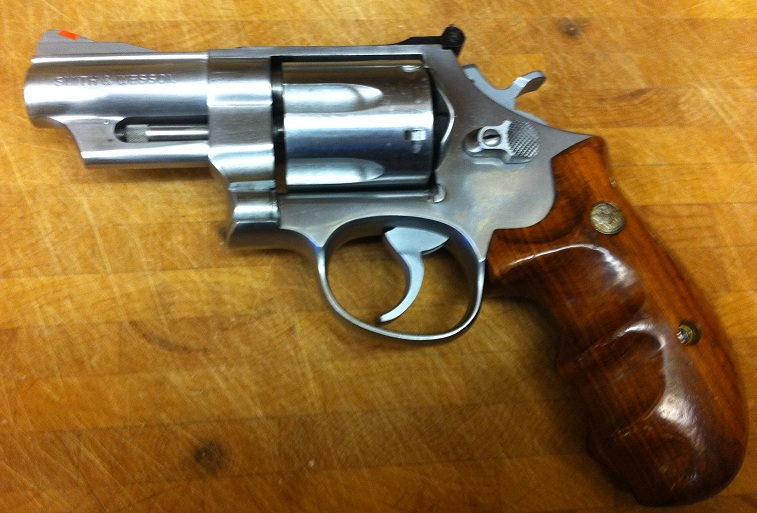
- 3″ S&W M 657
- Type: Revolver
- Place of origin: United States

Production history
- Manufacturer: Smith & Wesson
- Produced: 1964–1991, 2008–present
- Variants: See variants

Specifications
- Mass: 48 oz (6″ bbl)
- Barrel length: 3 in; 4 in; 6 in (153 mm); 8 3/8 in (214 mm)
- Cartridge: .41 Magnum
- Action: Double-action
- Feed system: 6-round cylinder
- Sights: Red insert front; adjustable rear

The Smith & Wesson Model 57 is an 'N' frame (large), double-action revolver with a six-round cylinder, chambered for the .41 Magnum cartridge, and designed and manufactured by the Smith & Wesson firearms company. The gun was designed as a weapon for law enforcement agencies. However, due to size and recoil, it found more favor with civilian target shooters and hunters.

== Development ==
In the early 1960s, Elmer Keith, Bill Jordan, and Skeeter Skelton, all noted firearms authorities and authors, lobbied Remington Arms and Smith & Wesson to introduce a new .41 caliber police cartridge with the objective of filling a perceived ballistic performance gap between the .357 and .44 Magnums, thus creating a chambering which they believed would be the ultimate for law enforcement purposes. In April 1964 Remington responded by introducing the .41 Magnum cartridge, and in concert, Smith & Wesson launched the Model 57 revolver chambered for the new ammunition. Elmer Keith originally proposed the name ".41 Police" for the new cartridge, but Remington instead chose .41 Magnum, hoping to capitalize on the notoriety and popularity of its earlier Magnum offerings.

== Features ==
First introduced in April 1964, the Model 57 was produced with 4", 6", 6-1/2", and 8-3/8" barrels in both highly polished blued and nickel–plated finishes. Using the S&W large "N" frame, the Model 57 was one of the companies’ premier products, offering superb fit and finish, basically the same pistol as the famous S&W Model 29, except in .41 instead of .44 caliber. Like the Model 29, the 57 sported a red insert front sight with a white outline adjustable rear iron open sight, as well as a target trigger, target hammer, and oversized wooden target grips.

== Engineering and Production Changes ==
Model	Year	Modifications
57	1964	Introduction
57	1968	Delete diamond grips
57	1969	Change to N serial number prefix
57-1	1982	Eliminate cylinder counterbore and pinned barrel, change in cylinder length to 1.67″
57-1	1986	Nickel finish discontinued
57-2	1988	New yoke retention system, radius stud, floating hand
57-3	1990	Longer stop notch in cylinder
57-3	1992	4″ and 83/8" barrel discontinued, blue finish only
57-4	1993	New rear sight leaf, drilled and tapped frame
57-4	1993	Discontinued
57-5	2005	Reintroduction of 4" Mountain Gun with internal lock, new frame design, limited production
57-6	2009	Reintroduction as part of the classic series with CNC frame design with internal lock in blue or nickel finish

== Ammunition ==
Remington originally offered two ammunition loadings in its .41 Magnum cartridge lineup. The first was a full-power 1300-1400 ft/s hunting or heavy-usage load using a jacketed soft point bullet which rivaled the stopping power of the mighty .44 Magnum while boasting less recoil and a flatter bullet trajectory. The second loading was a less powerful 1,150 ft/s 210 grain lead semiwadcutter intended for law enforcement usage.

== Market response ==
Due to a number of factors, the .41 Magnum unfortunately never became the "next great police loading" that its developers and supporters envisioned. First, the majority of departments and rank and file officers were perfectly content with their traditional .38 Special revolvers, and if more stopping power was needed, cartridges such as the popular .357 Magnum were available. In addition, when senior police officials could be convinced to evaluate the .41 Magnum, many complained that even the lighter .41 Magnum "Police load" was unpleasant to fire, while the .357 Magnum offered adequate performance without the bruising recoil and muzzle blast associated with the .41. Also, the marketing decision by S&W and Remington to dub the cartridge a "Magnum" ended up working against them in their desire to address the law enforcement market. Police organizations found the connotation of a high-powered "Magnum" hunting-type weapon to be unpalatable in an era when they were struggling with political correctness and pursued positive public relations to offset any possible public perception of police brutality. Although the .41 Magnum was adopted as a police departmental standard by a few cities, such as Amarillo and San Antonio, TX, and San Francisco, CA, most chose to pass. In addition, introduced in the shadow of its limelight-grabbing "big brother", the .44 Magnum Model 29, the Model 57 struggled from its onset to garner much market share. The .41 Magnum's bullet (at 0.410″) is only 0.019″ smaller than the destined-for-greatness .44 Magnum (at 0.429″). The popularity gap widened further when Clint Eastwood used a "most powerful handgun in the world", Model 29, in the popular film Dirty Harry. Following the film's release, many handguns that were contemporaries of the .44 Magnum—such as the .41—began to lose popularity with the general public and within the American firearms market. Finally, a series of hugely popular and successful lighter and smaller-framed revolvers crafted from stainless steel emerged in the mid-1980s. These police-issue oriented firearms, exemplified by models such as the S&W Model 66, accelerated the Model 57's demise. Overall, the Model 57 and its variants failed to generate the interest (or sales) which had been hoped for.

== Variants ==
Smith & Wesson offered an all stainless steel version of the Model 57 as the Model 657. The Model 657 was introduced in 1986.

A very rare 5" model 57 was produced in the custom shop. All known examples included the traditional short underlug/ejector shroud.

== Smith & Wesson Model 58 ==
On July 10, 1964, S&W introduced a more basic and inexpensive .41 Magnum intended for procurement by police departments. This budget version of the Model 57 was similar in principle of design to the .38 Special S&W heavy-barrel Model 10, or the .357 Magnum Model 28 Highway Patrolman. Weighing in at 41 ounces, the Model 58 featured a 4" barrel, fixed iron open sights, and simpler standard "magna service" grips. Finish options were the same as its upscale Model 57 brethren, blued and nickel, but shortly after the Model 58's introduction S&W decided a less expensive "matte" bluing treatment would be more appropriate for the basic "workingman" model. The no-frills Model 58 also lacked an ejection rod shroud, but retained the pinned barrel and counterbored cylinder of the more expensive Model 57. The Model 58 was manufactured from 1964 to 1977, and roughly 20,000 were produced. In 2008, it was released again by S&W, both in bright nickel and bright blue finishes.

== Users ==
- United States of America: San Antonio Police Department (Smith & Wesson Model 58)
