= .41 Special =

Revolver cartridge

- Type: Revolver
- Place of origin: United States

Production history
- Designed: 1963, late 1980s

Specifications
- Case type: Rimmed, straight
- Bullet diameter: .410 in (10.4 mm)
- Neck diameter: .434 in (11.0 mm)
- Base diameter: .434 in (11.0 mm)
- Rim diameter: .492 in (12.5 mm)
- Rim thickness: .060 in (1.5 mm)
- Case length: 1.165 in (29.6 mm)
- Overall length: 1.465 in (37.2 mm)
- Primer type: Large pistol
- Maximum CUP: ~25,000 CUP

The .41 Special—also commonly known as .41 Spl (pronounced "forty-one special"), .41 Spc, or 10.4x29mmR (metric designation)—is a wildcat (non-standardized) cartridge designed for revolvers, made to be a less powerful variant of the established .41 Remington Magnum. The cartridge was intended for police work, security and personal defense, using a 200 grain bullet at 900 feet per second. While proposed as early as 1955, it remains a niche, custom cartridge.

== History ==
In 1932, Colt researched a proposed ".41 Special" cartridge, but that shared only a name with the modern wildcat, having different measurements and even different bore diameter (.385). The concept of a .41 Special was later brought up by gunwriter Elmer Keith in his 1955 work Sixguns, where he proposed the .41 special as an analog to the .44 Special cartridge, but the idea did not gain ground.

Keith and Bill Jordan later proposed the .41 Magnum cartridge, which was formally adopted by Remington Arms in 1964. Thus counter to common practice, a "magnum" offering was standardized before a weaker "special" variant was ever introduced.

In the late 1980s pistolsmith Hamilton Bowen revived the idea of a 200gr bullet at 900fps in his custom designs.

== Firearms ==
While large-scale production firearms have not been produced for this niche chambering, custom gunsmiths have adapted existing firearms to use it, generally by machining a new cylinder and expanding the bore of existing .357 Magnum revolvers. Ammunition is not commercially produced, but boutique runs of brass for handloading, with proper .41 Special headstamps, have been issued.

Among the first gunsmiths to make a purpose-built firearm for this chambering was Hamilton Bowen, who modified the .357 caliber Ruger Security-Six and GP100 revolvers to accommodate the .41 Special, as well as a Colt revolver and a S&W 586.

== See also ==
- .38 Special
- .40 S&W
- .44 Special
- .41 Long Colt
- .41 Magnum
- 10 mm caliber
- List of rimmed cartridges
- List of handgun cartridges
- Table of handgun and rifle cartridges
