= .41 Remington Magnum =

American revolver cartridge

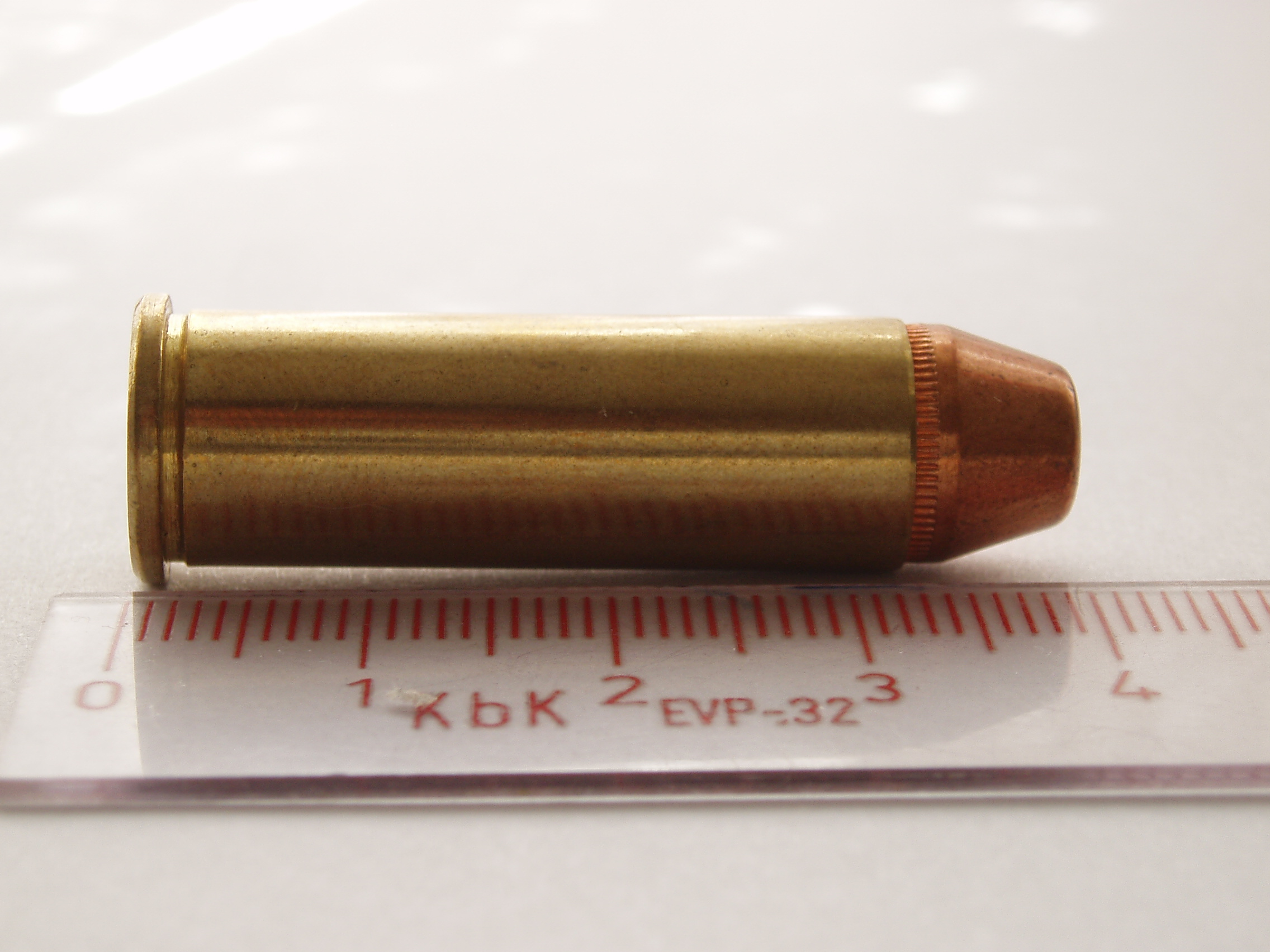
- .41 Remington Magnum cartridge, scale in cm
- Type: Revolver
- Place of origin: United States

Production history
- Designer: Elmer Keith; Bill Jordan; Skeeter Skelton
- Designed: 1963
- Manufacturer: Remington Arms
- Produced: 1964

Specifications
- Parent case: None
- Case type: Rimmed, straight
- Bullet diameter: .410 in (10.4 mm)
- Neck diameter: .434 in (11.0 mm)
- Base diameter: .434 in (11.0 mm)
- Rim diameter: .492 in (12.5 mm)
- Rim thickness: .060 in (1.5 mm)
- Case length: 1.290 in (32.8 mm)
- Overall length: 1.590 in (40.4 mm)
- Case capacity: 34 gr H_{2}O (2.2 cm^{3})
- Rifling twist: 1-18 1/2 in
- Primer type: Large pistol
- Maximum pressure (CIP): 44,000 psi (300 MPa)
- Maximum pressure (SAAMI): 36,000 psi (250 MPa)
- Maximum CUP: 40,000 CUP

Ballistic performance
Bullet mass/type	Velocity	Energy
170 gr (11 g) JHP Cor-Bon	1,275 ft/s (389 m/s)	614 ft⋅lbf (832 J)
210 gr (14 g) JHP	1,560 ft/s (480 m/s)	1,135 ft⋅lbf (1,539 J)
240 gr (16 g) FMJ+P Winchester	1,250 ft/s (380 m/s)	833 ft⋅lbf (1,129 J)
265 gr (17 g) HP-GC Buffalo Bore Heavy	1,350 ft/s (410 m/s)	1,072 ft⋅lbf (1,453 J)
- Test barrel length: 6.5 inches (170 mm); Source: Ballistics by the inch

The .41 Remington Magnum, also known as .41 Magnum or 10.4×33mmR (as it is known in unofficial metric designation), is a centerfire cartridge primarily developed for use in large-frame revolvers, introduced in 1964 by the Remington Arms Company, intended for hunting and law enforcement purposes.

== Development ==
In 1963, Elmer Keith and Bill Jordan, with some help from Skeeter Skelton, petitioned Smith & Wesson, Remington, and Norma to produce a pistol and ammunition in .41 caliber which would fall between the extant .357 Magnum and .44 Magnum cartridges in ballistic performance, and at the same time address perceived shortcomings with those loads. While as early as 1955 Keith had suggested a new, medium-powered ".41 Special" cartridge, this idea was passed over in favor of the higher-powered "Magnum" option, and the Special survives only as a custom wildcat cartridge, bearing roughly the same relation to the .41 Magnum as the .38 Special does to the .357 Magnum and as the .44 Special does to the .44 Magnum.

The .357 Magnum suffered from restricted terminal ballistic effectiveness in the early 1960s, as jacketed hollow point bullets were not yet commonly available, and the manufacturers' standard loadings consisted of simple lead bullets. The powerful .44 Magnum, primarily a heavy hunting round, was considered overkill for police use, generating too much recoil for control under rapid fire. In addition, the revolvers chambered for the .44 Magnum were considered too large, bulky, and heavy for police to carry.

Keith's original vision called for dual power levels in the .41, a heavy magnum load pushing a 210-grain (14 g) JHP at a muzzle velocity of 1,300–1,400 ft/s (400–430 m/s), and a milder police loading which was to send a 200-grain (13 g) semiwadcutter downrange at around 900 ft/s (270 m/s).

These plans went awry due to an ongoing fascination in the firearms community with high-powered cartridges; Remington was swayed by this community's influence and instead of following Keith's blueprint, chose to emphasize the performance of the new cartridge. As a result, the .41 "Magnum" load was released at an advertised 1,500 ft/s (460 m/s), and even the "light" police loading was introduced with a 210 gr (14 g) lead semiwadcutter "warmed up" to about 1,150 ft/s (350 m/s). However, the police load as delivered was regarded as overpowered by most law enforcement agencies, many of which were still using .38 Special revolvers.

Additionally, Smith & Wesson had simply adapted their large N-frame revolvers for the new cartridge, which did not address size and weight concerns. The Model 58, targeted for the law enforcement market, was introduced on July 10, 1964. Weighing 41 oz (1,200 g), the Model 58 compared unfavorably with other revolvers available at the time, such as Smith's own 34 oz (960 g) Model 10 in .38 Special.

These combined factors mostly eliminated the .41 Magnum from consideration for its intended market as a law enforcement firearm, although it continued to be touted as such and was adopted by a few law enforcement agencies.

For a handgun cartridge, the bolt thrust is considerable at C.I.P. conform maximum loads and an important factor in weapons design. The greater the bolt thrust, the stronger the locking mechanism has to be to withstand it. Smith & Wesson produced a high-end, premium revolver in .41 Magnum, the Model 57, identical to the .44 Magnum-chambered Model 29. Magnum Research's Desert Eagle division produced a .41 Magnum in their semi-automatic Mark VII. Sturm Ruger also produced their Blackhawk single-action revolver in .41 Magnum.

A couple of manufacturers have produced lever-action rifles chambered in .41 Magnum. Marlin produced four variants of its Model 1894, but no longer offers any model chambered for it. Henry Repeating Arms introduced a .41 Magnum variant of their Big Boy Steel model in 2016.

== Market reception ==
The .41 Magnum never enjoyed the popularity and success of either the .357 Magnum or .44 Magnum cartridges, but is still prized by handgun hunters as some feel it generates somewhat lighter recoil and slightly flatter bullet trajectory at long range than the .44 Magnum. Nevertheless, the .44 Magnum still catalogs a greater variety of heavier bullet weight offerings which are more effective on larger game, and boast a slight edge in power when using the heaviest factory loads, or if pushed to the edge by handloading (heavier bullets or bullets of different types). Marshall and Sanow called the .41 Magnum "one of our most unappreciated calibers".

== See also ==
- .41 Special
- .41 Long Colt
- .41 Action Express
- 10 mm caliber
- List of handgun cartridges
- Table of handgun and rifle cartridges
