= .41 Short Colt =

Type of bullet cartridge

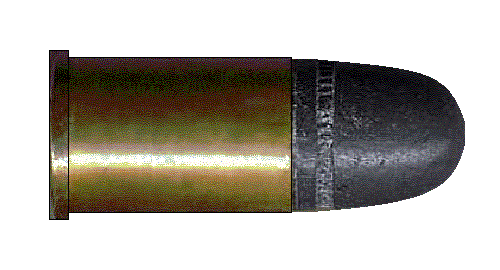
- .41 Short Colt cartridge
- Type: Revolver
- Place of origin: United States

Production history
- Designed: 1873
- Manufacturer: Colt's Manufacturing Company
- Produced: 1875–1939

Specifications
- Bullet diameter: .402 in (10.2 mm)
- Neck diameter: .406 in (10.3 mm)
- Base diameter: .406 in (10.3 mm)
- Rim diameter: .451 in (11.5 mm)
- Case length: .637 in (16.2 mm)
- Overall length: 1,057

The .41 Short Colt (10.2x16mmR) cartridge was created in 1873 for Colt's single-action "New Line" revolver.

== History and description ==
This revolver cartridge was introduced to the American market for the New Line S A. revolver in 1873. The cartridge has a larger edge diameter than the cartridges of newer designs for trigger-tension revolvers. It can be used in these weapons, but it is necessary to charge every other chamber. After the introduction of revolvers with trigger tensioning, the production of this cartridge was terminated. The .41 Short Colt could be used in revolvers chambered for .41 Long Colt interchangeably. Both cartridges originally had an outside lubricated bullet with a small diameter heel fitting the neck of the case.

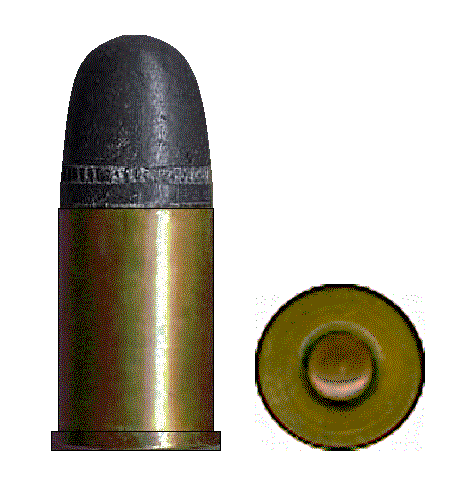
The .41 Short Colt cartridge.

== Dimensions ==
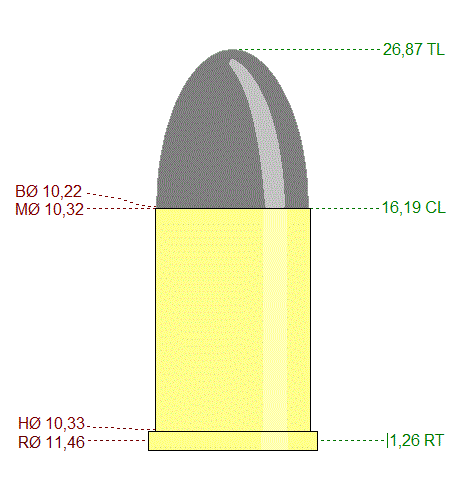

== See also ==
- 10 mm caliber
- Colt Model 1877
- .45 Colt
- .45 Schofield
- .41 Short
- .32 Long Colt
- .38 Short Colt
- .38 Long Colt
- .44 Colt
- .41 Magnum
- .41 Special
- List of rimmed cartridges
- List of handgun cartridges
