= .41 Long Colt =

Revolver cartridge

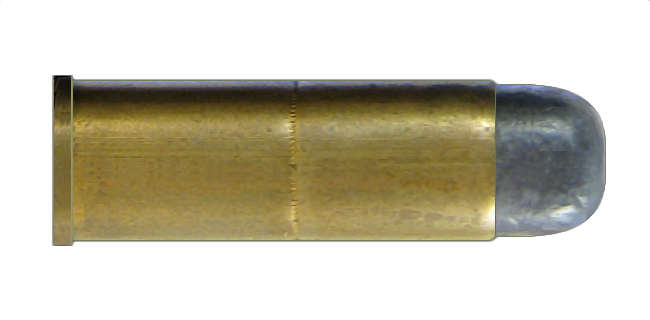
- .41 Long Colt cartridge
- Type: Revolver
- Place of origin: United States

Production history
- Designed: 1877
- Manufacturer: Colt's Manufacturing Company
- Produced: 1877–1939

Specifications
- Parent case: .41 Short Colt
- Bullet diameter: 0.386 in (9.8 mm)
- Neck diameter: .400 in (10.2 mm)
- Base diameter: .405 in (10.3 mm)
- Rim diameter: .434 in (11.0 mm)
- Rim thickness: .077 in (2.0 mm)
- Case length: 1.126 in (28.6 mm)
- Overall length: 1.397 in (35.5 mm)
- Case capacity: 20 gr H_{2}O (1.3 cm^{3})
- Maximum pressure (CIP): 13,000 psi (90 MPa)

The .41 Long Colt / 9.8x28mmR cartridge was created in 1877 for Colt's double-action "Thunderer" revolver.

== History and description ==
The .41 Long Colt was a lengthened version of the earlier centerfire .41 Short Colt, which was made to duplicate the dimensions of the even earlier .41 Short rimfire. The front of the bullet was about 0.406–0.408" OD, the same as the case. The barrel was about 0.404–0.406" groove diameter. The bullet lubrication was outside the case. At 0.386–0.388" OD, The base of the bullet was smaller in diameter to fit inside the case. This is known as a "heel-base" or heeled bullet. The only modern heeled bullet is the .22 rimfire.

In the mid-1890s, Colt redesigned the cartridge. They reduced the entire diameter of the bullet to 0.386" OD and lengthened the brass case in order to put both the bullet and its lubrication inside the case. The overall length of both loaded cartridges was about the same. The barrel of the revolver was reduced slightly to match the more popular .38-40 at 0.400–0.401" groove diameter. This meant that the outside diameter (OD) of the new bullet was smaller than the barrel's bore, let alone its groove diameter. A hollow-base bullet can be dropped down the bore by gravity alone. The newer soft lead bullet was made with a large hollow base, like Civil War Minié balls. The intent was for the base of the bullet to expand and obturate with the pressure of the burning gunpowder to grip the rifling.

The original .41 Long Colt brass cases came in three primary lengths, although they vary quite a bit within a headstamp. The first ones were the shortest at about 0.932 to 0.937" long. In balloon-head cases, they held about 20 gr of compressed black powder (BP) with a 200 gr flat-bottom, heel-base, blunt-nose bullet. The next cases were about 1.130 to 1.138" long with a 200 gr hollow-base, blunt-nose bullet and about 21 gr of BP (also in balloon-head cases). Although the brass case lengths were far different, both cartridges were about the same overall length when loaded. The last brass case length was 1.050 to 1.100" long and was created exclusively for hand loaders so that both heel-base and hollow-base bullets could be used interchangeably (note that cartridges made from the longest brass cases and heel-base bullets are too long to fit most .41 Long Colt revolvers).

The accuracy of the .41 Long Colt is adequate for what it was intended; close range self-defense, its drawback had more to do with the heavy double-action trigger pull of the Thunderer. Elmer Keith wrote in his book Sixguns that the ".41 Long Colt was a better fight-stopper than its paper ballistics would indicate" and it was "better for self-defense than any .38 Special load made". Keith would go on to design the .41 Magnum, possibly influenced by the advantages of the .41 Long Colt. However, .41 Long Colt cannot be fired out of a revolver chambered for either .41 Special or .41 Magnum.

The .41 Long Colt worked well considering the mismatch of bullet and bore sizes, but by the beginning of World War I it was in serious decline and it fell from use by the beginning of World War II. The .41 Long Colt was a moderately popular chambering in several Colt models. It was available in the Model 1877 Thunderer double action revolver, the series of New Army and New Navy revolvers of 1889, 1892 94,95,96, 1901 & 1903, the Single Action Army, 1878 double action, the Bisley Model, the Army Special-Official Police. Today, the .41 Long Colt is a mere relic of the past and is considered obsolete. It is currently only produced sporadically for high prices by a handful of small manufacturers such as Ultramax, as the Model 1877 Colt Thunderer is considered by collectors too valuable to shoot.

== Dimensions ==
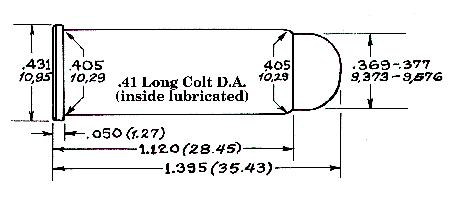

== See also ==
- 10 mm caliber
- Colt Model 1877
- .45 Colt
- .45 Schofield
- .41 Short
- .32 Long Colt
- .38 Short Colt
- .38 Long Colt
- .44 Colt
- .41 Magnum
- .41 Special
- List of rimmed cartridges
- List of handgun cartridges
