= Smith & Wesson Model 19 =

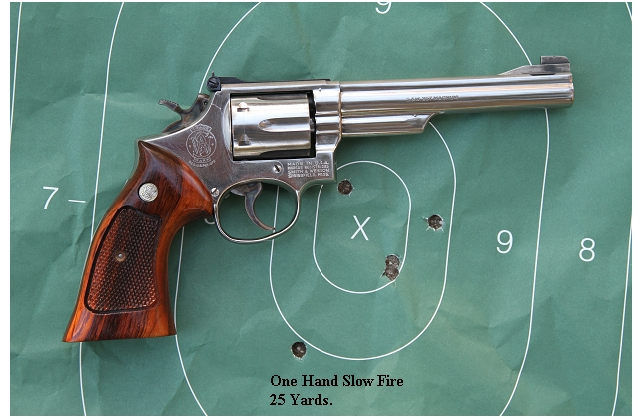
- S&W Model 19, polished nickel finish, 6" barrel
- Type: Revolver
- Place of origin: United States

Production history
- Designer: Smith & Wesson
- Manufacturer: Smith & Wesson
- Produced: 1957–1999; 2018–present
- Variants: Model 66 (stainless steel); Model 68 (stainless steel, .38 Special)

Specifications
- Cartridge: .357 Magnum.38 Special
- Action: Double action
- Feed system: 6-round cylinder
- Sights: Adjustable

The Smith & Wesson Model 19 is a revolver produced by Smith & Wesson that was introduced in 1957 on its K-frame. The Model 19 is chambered for .357 Magnum. The K-frame is somewhat smaller and lighter than the original N-frame .357, usually known as the Smith & Wesson Model 27. A stainless steel variant of the Model 19, the Smith & Wesson Model 66, was introduced in 1971.

== History ==
The .357 Magnum is the oldest "magnum" handgun cartridge. Smith & Wesson played a major part in the development and success of the cartridge and revolver that went with it. Firearms writer and experimenter Philip Sharpe is credited for its development during the 1930s when police agencies were asking for a more powerful round. S&W's Douglas B. Wesson agreed to produce a new revolver that would handle "high-intensity" .38 Special loads, but only if Winchester would develop a new cartridge. Elmer Keith, a well known author and wildcatter at the time, was experimenting with hand loading .38 Special ammunition beyond their original specifications, taking advantage of the newer and better designed firearm frames and metallurgy, and also played a major role in the development of the .357 Magnum. Winchester introduced the .357 Magnum, which was dimensionally identical to the .38 Special except for a .125 inch longer case, and the first revolvers (referred to as ".357 Magnum Models") were completed by S&W on April 8, 1935.

Retired Assistant Chief Patrol Inspector of the U.S. Border Patrol, famous gunfighter, and noted firearms and shooting skills writer Bill Jordan consulted with Smith & Wesson on the design and characteristics of the Model 19. Jordan's idea for a "peace officer's dream" sidearm was a heavy-barreled four-inch K-Frame .357 Magnum with a shrouded barrel like the big N-frame .357 and adjustable sights. After a year of experimentation with improved-strength steels and special heat-treating processes, the result was the .357 Combat Magnum (later designated Model 19), with the first serial-number gun (K260,000) presented to Jordan on November 15, 1955.

A rare S&W M19-3 was built for the French GIGN. In 1972, they ordered 500 of these revolvers that have serial numbers in the M&P range from D639300 to 639800. With only 500 guns produced, this is the rarest M19 version. This specific model 19-3 has a fixed sight and is pinned & recessed. It has a three-inch barrel.

At some point in the 1960s or 1970s, gunsmiths would customize Model 19s by attaching a Colt Python barrel to them. The resulting guns were known as "Smythons" or "Smolts". Massad Ayoob of American Handgunner speculated that such a modification was done for the PPC, the Practical Police Course.

== Styles ==
The Model 19 was produced in blued carbon steel or nickel-plated steel with wood or rubber combat grips, an adjustable rear sight, full-target or semi-target hammer, serrated wide target trigger or combat-type trigger, and was available in 2.5" (3": Model 66—rare), 4", or 6-inch barrel lengths. The weights are 30.5 ounces, 36 ounces, and 39 ounces, respectively. The 2.5- and 3-inch barrel versions had round butts, while the others had square butts. They are manufactured with heavy barrels.

The Model 19 was produced from 1957 (first model number stampings) to November 1999. The Model 66 was produced from 1970 until 2005. The Model 66 differed by its use of stainless steel and its smooth target-type trigger. The Model 68 was a limited-production version of the Model 66 made for the California Highway Patrol and Los Angeles Police Department chambered in .38 Special with a 6" barrel.

The Model 19 and the Model 66 had the same trigger options. One of the last variations of the Model 19 ordered for police use was the 2.5" Model 19-5, special ordered under SKU #100701 as the standard issue sidearm for Special Agents of the US Department of State's Diplomatic Security Service. This model featured a .400" wide, smooth "combat" trigger, Pachmayr Professional Compac rubber grips, and most notably a matte black finish instead of the common high-polished blue. The 2.5" barrelled Model 66 was carried by INS Special Agents until the mid-1990s when the agency adopted a .40 caliber semi-automatic pistol as its standard issue sidearm.

The most recent variants have eliminated the flat cut of the forcing cone needed to clear the cylinder gas ring. This was a source of weakness and cracked forcing cones were not uncommon with steady use of .357 ammunition, particularly 125 grain or lighter higher velocity loads.

== Engineering and production changes ==
Engineering changes were designated with a "dash-" number after the model number. The engineering changes are as follows:

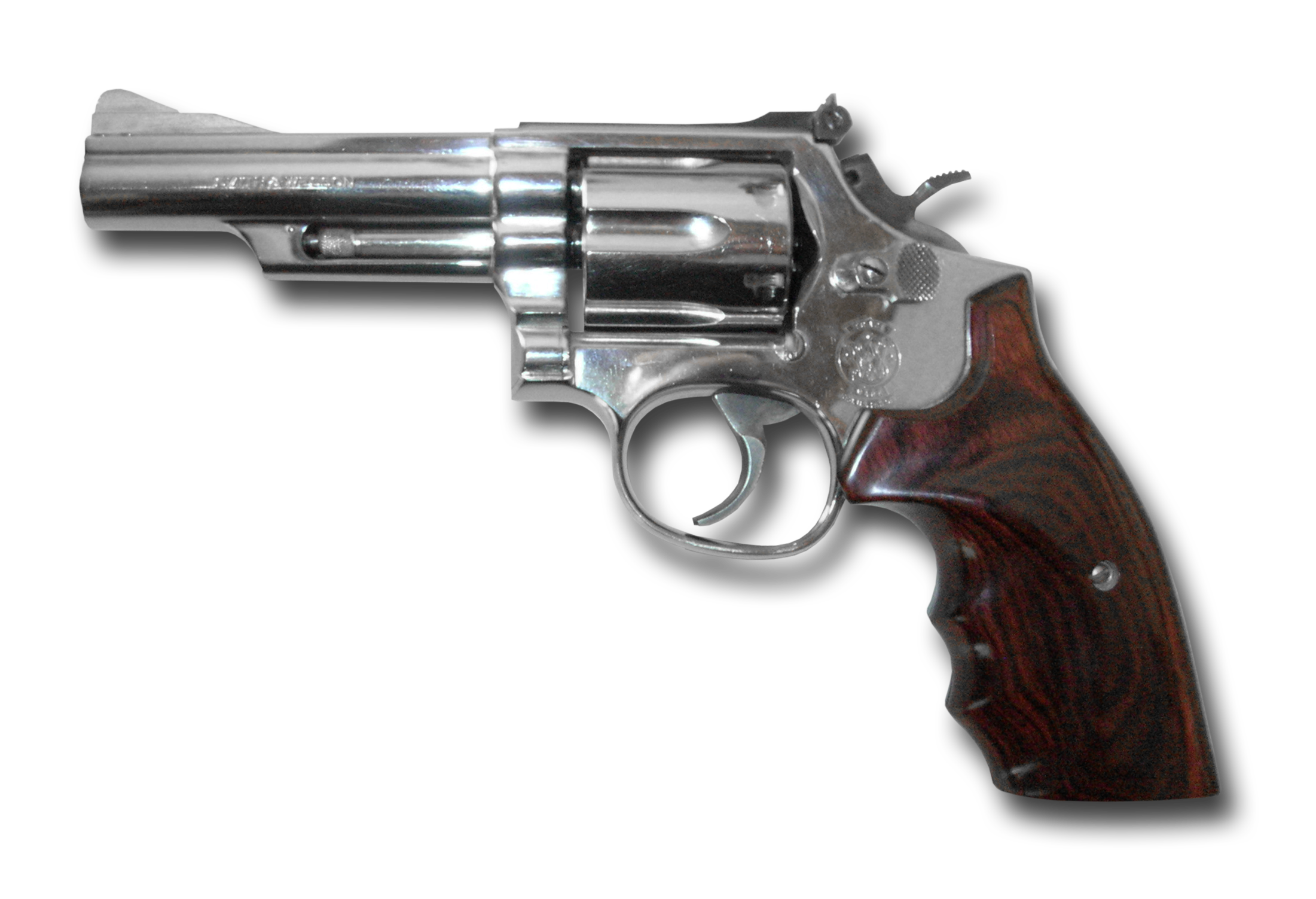
4" Model 19-5, polished nickel plated with woodgrain square grips

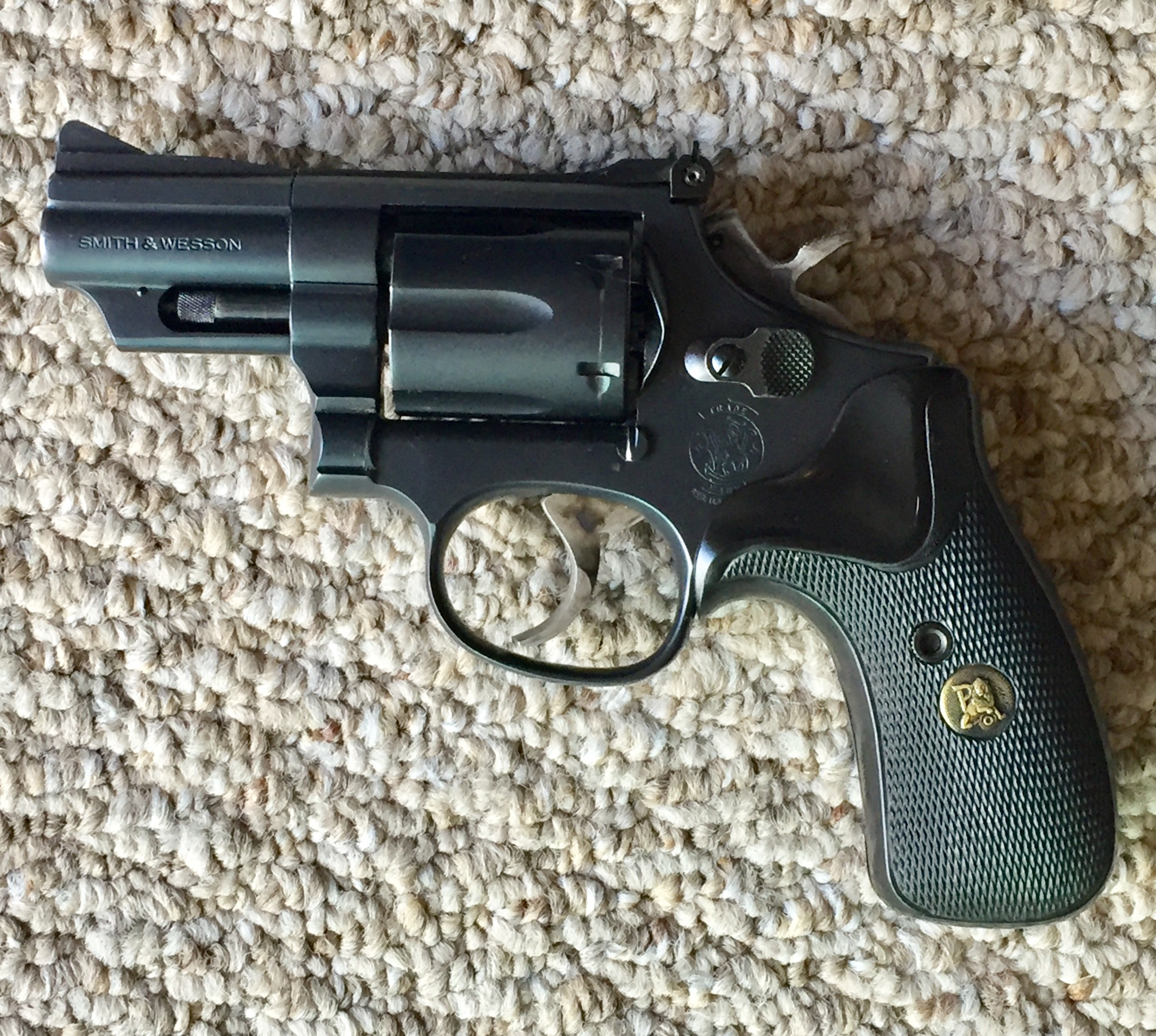
2.5" Model 19-5 of the US Diplomatic Security Service, featuring unusual matte black finish

Model	Year	Modifications
19	1957	Introduction.
19-1	1959	Change extractor rod, right to left-hand thread.
19-2	1961	Cylinder stop changed, removed trigger guard screw.
19-2	1963	Introduce 6" barrel.
19-2	1963	50 manufactured with 2.5" barrel, serial range K544672–K544721.
19-2	1966	Introduce 2.5" barrel as standard.
19-3	1967	Relocation of rear sight leaf screw.
19-3	1968	Delete diamond-insert grip.
19-4	1977	Change gas ring from yoke to cylinder.
19-5	1982	Eliminate cylinder counter bore and pinned barrel; small change in cylinder length to 1.62".
19-6	1988	New yoke retention system; radius stud package; floating hand; hammer nose bushing.
19-6	1992	Blue finish only is cataloged.
19-7	1994	Add Uncle Mike's Combat synthetic grips; drill and tap frame; change extractor; change rear sight leaf.
19-7	1995	Delete square butt.
19-7	1996	Discontinue 6" barrel production; begin shipments in blue foam-filled plastic cases.
19-7	1997	Change to MIM thumb piece and trigger, ship with trigger locks.
19-8	1998	Change frame design, eliminate cylinder stop stud, serrated tangs.
19-8	1998	Add internal lock, add MIM hammer w/ floating firing pin.
19-8	1999	Model 19 discontinued
19-9	2018	Reintroduced with 4.25" barrel and Performance Center Carry Comp with 3" barrel.
19-9	2018	Change to ejector rod and center pin lockup to yoke detent lockup. Gas ring and forcing cone rework to eliminate flat cut on forcing cone.
19-10	2025	Removed internal lock.

=== Model 66 ===
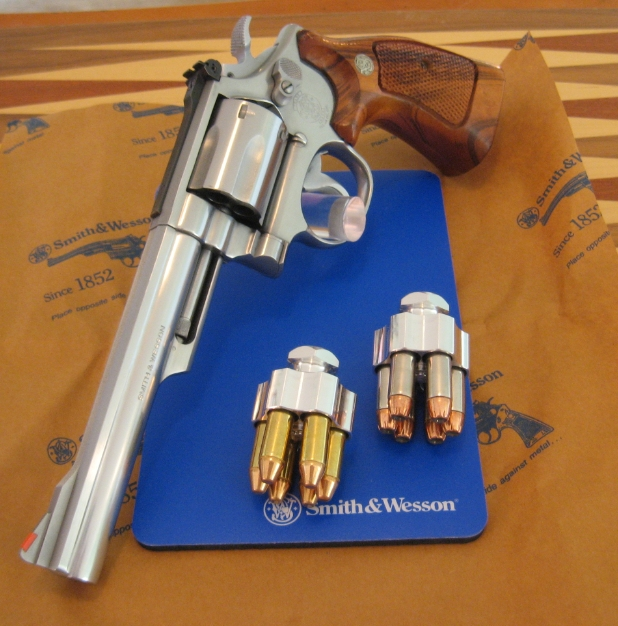
A model 66-2, displayed with two speedloaders

Model	Year	Modifications
66	1971	Stamping of each model.
66-1	1977	Changed the gas ring from the yoke to the cylinder.
66-2	1982	Eliminated pinned and recessed, slightly lengthened cylinder.
66-3	1986	New yoke retention system/radius stud package/hammer nose bushing/floating hand.
66-4	1994	Change rear sight leaf, drill and tap frame, introduce Uncle Mike's grips, change extractor.
66-5	1998	Change in frame design: eliminate cylinder stop stud/eliminate serrated tangs/change to MIM hammer with floating firing pin/change internal lock work.
66-6	2002	Introduced internal lock.
66-7	2003	Two piece barrel and internal lock.
66-7	2005	Discontinued.
66-8	2014	Reintroduced with 4.25" barrel; 2.75" barrel offering added in 2017.

=== Model 68 ===
Model	Year	Modifications
68	1977	Introduction

== Users ==
- Australia: South Australia Police, replaced with Smith & Wesson M&P.
- Germany Known to be used by GSG 9 when the unit expects to use it in close quarters.
- Japan: Formerly used by Special Security Team with 4 inch barrels.
- United States
  - Iowa State Police
  - West Virginia State Police
  - South Dakota State Police Chrome finish
  - Connecticut State Police Model 66 with 4 inch barrel
  - United States Border Patrol
  - Immigration and Naturalization Service
  - Salt Lake City Police Department Switched back to a revolver in the form of the Smith & Wesson Model 66 after initially issuing the Smith & Wesson Model 59 9mm automatic pistol.
  - Federal Bureau of Investigation Carried by FBI agents during the 1986 FBI Miami shootout.
  - Naval Criminal Investigative Service

== Bibliography ==
- Komine, Takao [in Japanese]; Sakamoto, Shinichi [in Japanese] (2005). SST - the Japan Coast Guard Special Forces (in Japanese). Namiki-shobou. ISBN 978-4890631933.
- Tophoven, Rolf (1984). GSG 9: German response to terrorism. Bernard & Graefe Verlag. ISBN 978-3763750887.
