= Charles Askins =

American army officer (1907–1999)

Charles Askins, Jr.
- Born: October 28, 1907; Texas, U.S.
- Died: March 2, 1999 (aged 91); San Antonio, Texas, U.S.
- Burial place: Fort Sam Houston National Cemetery
- Military career
- Allegiance: United States of America
- Branch: United States Army
- Service years: 1940–1971
- Rank: Colonel
- Nickname: Boots
- Conflicts: World War II
- Other work: US Border Patrol

Charles Askins Jr. (October 28, 1907 – March 2, 1999), also known as Col. Charles "Boots" Askins, was an American lawman, US Army officer, and writer. He served in law enforcement (US Forest Service and Border Patrol) in the American Southwest prior to the Second World War. Askins was the son of Major Charles "Bobo" Askins, a sports writer and Army officer who served in the Spanish–American War and World War I.

== Early life ==
Askins was born in Texas, raised in Oklahoma and his first job was fighting forest fires in Montana. In 1927, the US Forest Service transferred him to New Mexico to be a Park Ranger at the Kit Carson National Forest.

== The US Border Patrol ==
Askins was recruited by the U.S. Border Patrol in 1930. In his memoir Unrepentant Sinner, Askins recounted that he had been involved in at least one gunfight every week.

During his service in the Border Patrol, Askins won many pistol championships, and was made the leader of the Border Patrol's handgun skills program.

== US Army and later life ==
Askins served in the US Army during World War II as a battlefield recovery officer, making landings in North Africa, Italy, and on D-day. After World War II, he spent several years in Spain as an attache to the American embassy there, helping Franco rebuild Spain's munition plants. After his assignment in Spain, he was reassigned to Vietnam, where he trained South Vietnamese soldiers in shooting and airborne operations. Throughout his military career, he indulged in big game hunting at every opportunity, and continued to do so after his retirement. He held several big game hunting records in his lifetime, as well as two national pistol championships, an American Handgunner of the Year award, and innumerable smaller titles in competitive shooting. Askins retired to San Antonio, Texas after his final years in the military at Fort Sam Houston.

Askins, like his father, was a prolific writer, writing books and over 1,000 magazine articles on subjects related to hunting and shooting. His writing career spanned 70 years, from 1929 until his death in 1999. He was buried at Fort Sam Houston National Cemetery.

== Legacy ==
Askins was controversial for the relish with which he described the numerous fatal shootings in his law enforcement and military careers, stating he had killed 27 men. Because he was involved in numerous shootouts along the US/Mexico border, and due to his stated practice of not keeping track of African-Americans and Hispanics, the actual number of killings he committed was potentially much higher. Askins once remarked that he thought he was a psychopathic killer, and that he hunted animals so avidly because he was not allowed to hunt men anymore. Askins was a contemporary of Bill Jordan, Elmer Keith, Skeeter Skelton, and Jack O'Connor. These people, except for Skelton, as well as Askins, Audie Murphy, and Ed McGivern, were used as inspiration for characters in the Stephen Hunter novel Pale Horse Coming.

== Books written by Askins ==
- Hitting the Bull's-Eye, Fitchburg, Mass., Iver Johnson's Arms & Cycle Works, c1939.
- The Art of Handgun Shooting, New York, A.S. Barnes, 1941.
- Wing and Trap Shooting, New York, Macmillan, 1948.
- The Pistol Shooter's Book, Harrisburg, Penn., Stackpole, 1953 (2nd ed. 1961).
- Unrepentant Sinner: The Autobiography Of Col. Charles Askins
- The Gunfighters: True Tales of Outlaws, Lawmen, and Indians on the Texas Frontier with William Askins
- Shotgun-ology: A Handbook of Useful Shotgun Information
- The African Hunt
- Asian jungle, African Bush
- The Shotgunner's Book - A Modern Encyclopedia
- Texans, Guns & History
- The Federalist (The Firearms Classics Library)
