= Bill Jordan (American lawman) =

American lawman, US Marine and author (1911–1997)

William Henry Jordan
- Born: May 20, 1911; Cheneyville, Louisiana, U.S.
- Died: October 7, 1997 (aged 86); Linden, Texas, U.S.
- Military career
- Allegiance: United States
- Branch: United States Marine Corps
- Service years: 1941–1971
- Rank: Colonel
- Nickname: Bill Jordan
- Conflicts: World War II; Korean War
- Other work: US Border Patrol

William Henry Jordan (1911–1997) was an American lawman, United States Marine and author.

== Biography ==
Born in 1911 in Louisiana, he served for over 28 years with the United States Border Patrol. He also served in the United States Marine Corps Reserve during World War II and the Korean War. He retired from the Marine Reserve as a colonel.

Jordan is credited with developing the 'Jordan' or 'Border Patrol' style of holster. The Jordan rig is rigid and unmoving, always holding the gunbutt in precisely the same relationship to the gun hand. The revolver's trigger guard is completely exposed, and the gun is held away from the back portion of the holster by a plug of leather, allowing the trigger finger to enter the guard as the draw is begun.

Jordan also collaborated with Walter Roper in designing wooden grips for heavy-calibre double-action revolvers, which are now made by Herrett's Stocks as the "Jordan Trooper". Jordan always favored a double-action revolver for law enforcement duties. He was largely responsible for convincing Smith & Wesson to adapt its medium K-frame series revolver to accommodate the .357 Magnum cartridge, resulting in the (S&W Model 19 and S&W Model 66) "Combat Magnum" models.

After retiring from the Border Patrol, Jordan served as a Southwestern Field Representative for the National Rifle Association of America. He was a contemporary of Charles Askins, Elmer Keith, Skeeter Skelton and to a lesser degree, Jack O'Connor. In 1963, Jordan assisted Keith and Skelton in development of the .41 Magnum. He wrote numerous articles on all aspects of firearms, as well as books such as No Second Place Winner, Mostly Huntin' and Tales of the Rio Grande. Jordan was awarded the Presidential Medal of Freedom by President Ronald Reagan.

Using a double-action revolver, Bill Jordan was recorded drawing, firing and hitting his target in .27 of a second. He appeared on such television programs as To Tell the Truth, I've Got a Secret, You Asked for It, and Wide Wide World. Bill Jordan died on October 7, 1997, at 86 years of age in Linden, Texas. He was buried at Linden Cemetery.
