= .44 Special =

Revolver cartridge designed by Smith & Wesson (S&W)

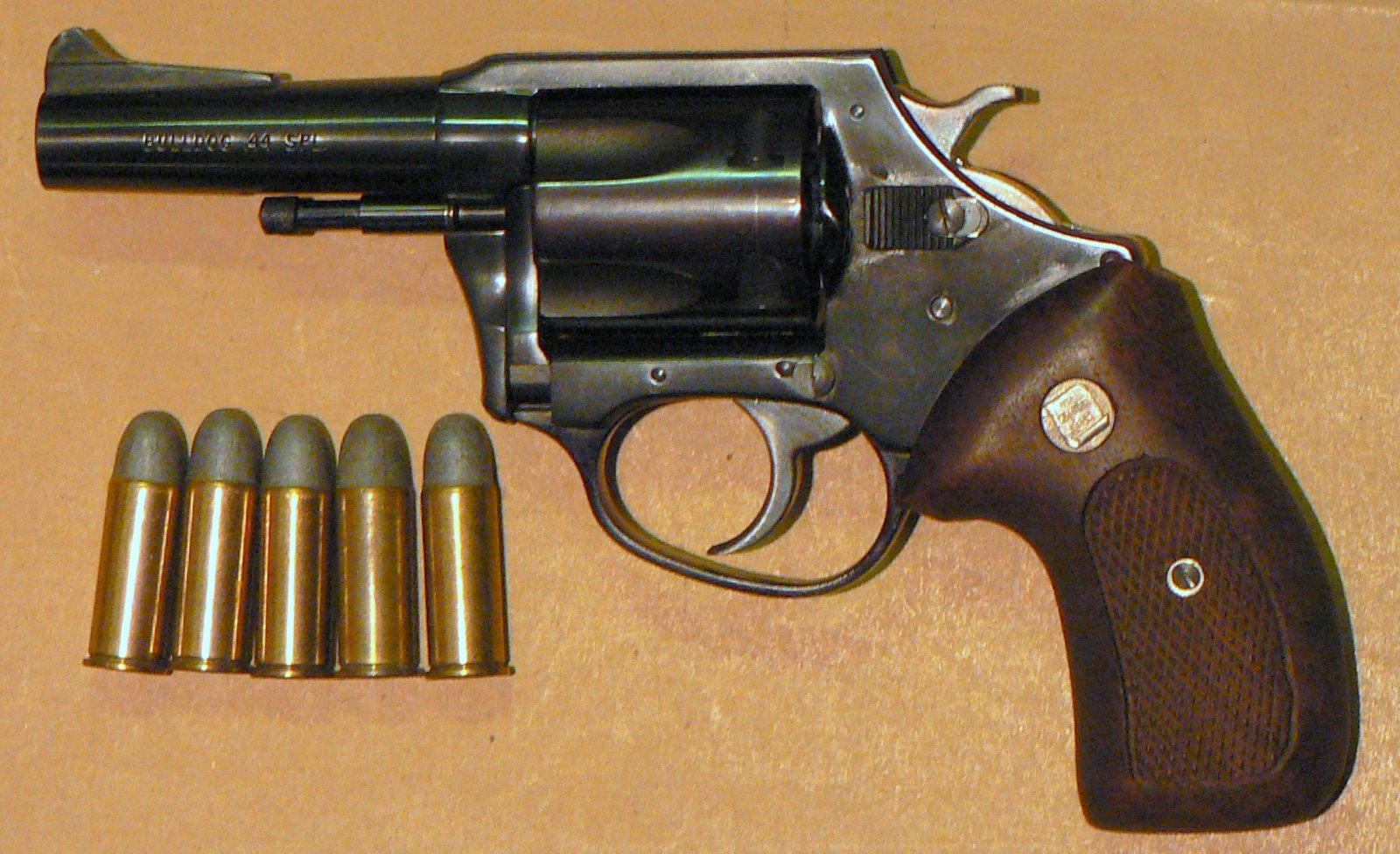
- Charter Arms Bulldog with five .44 Special 246 gr LRN cartridges
- Type: Revolver
- Place of origin: United States

Production history
- Designer: Smith & Wesson
- Designed: 1907
- Manufacturer: Smith & Wesson
- Produced: 1907–present

Specifications
- Parent case: .44 Russian
- Case type: Rimmed, straight
- Bullet diameter: .429 in (10.9 mm)
- Neck diameter: .457 in (11.6 mm)
- Base diameter: .457 in (11.6 mm)
- Rim diameter: .514 in (13.1 mm)
- Rim thickness: .060 in (1.5 mm)
- Case length: 1.16 in (29 mm)
- Overall length: 1.615 in (41.0 mm)
- Case capacity: 33.5 gr H_{2}O (2.17 cm^{3})
- Rifling twist: 1 in 20 in (510 mm)
- Primer type: Large pistol
- Maximum pressure: 15,500 psi (107 MPa)

Ballistic performance
| Bullet mass/type | Velocity | Energy |
|---|---|---|
| 200 gr (13 g) Semi-Wadcutter HP | 870 ft/s (270 m/s) | 336 ft⋅lbf (456 J) |
| 246 gr (16 g) LRN | 755 ft/s (230 m/s) | 310 ft⋅lbf (420 J) |
- Test barrel length: 4 in (100 mm) (vented) / 6 in (150 mm); Source: Federal Cartridge Co. Remington Arms Co.

The .44 Smith & Wesson Special, also commonly known as .44 S&W Special, .44 Special, .44 Spl, .44 Spc, or 10.9×29mmR, is a smokeless powder centerfire metallic revolver cartridge developed by Smith & Wesson in 1907 as the standard chambering for their New Century revolver, introduced in 1908.

== Development ==
On the late 19th century American frontier, large .44- and .45-caliber cartridges were considered the epitome of handgun ammunition for self-protection, home defense, and hunting. Black-powder rounds such as the .44 American, .44 Russian, .44 Colt, .44-40 Winchester, .45 Schofield, and .45 Colt enjoyed well-earned reputations for effective terminal ballistics, accuracy, and reliability.

At the start of the 20th century, Smith & Wesson decided to celebrate by introducing a brand-new revolver design which they called the New Century.

Smith & Wesson wished to pair their new revolver design with a worthy new ammunition chambering. At the time, smokeless powder was state of the art in ammunition technology. Older black-powder ammunition was in the process of being converted to smokeless. Smith & Wesson's popular .44 Russian cartridge had established a reputation for superb accuracy and was a renowned target load, and they decided to use an improved smokeless powder version as the basis for the new round. Due to the lower energy density of the early semi-smokeless powders, prior efforts to convert the .44 Russian to smokeless had produced less than stellar ballistic performance. Smith & Wesson addressed this issue by lengthening the .44 Russian cartridge case by 0.190-inch (4.8 mm) and increasing the powder capacity by 6 grains (0.39 g). The resulting design, which S&W called the .44 Special, had a case length of 1.16-inch (29 mm).

== Ballistics ==
Unfortunately, the ballistics of the new cartridge merely duplicated the 246-grain (15.9 g) bullet at 755 ft/s (230 m/s) statistics of the .44 Russian, when the powder capacity of its case would have supported performance rivaling that of the .45 Colt and close to the .44-40. Nevertheless, the .44 Special retained its progenitor's reputation for accuracy. The SAAMI maximum pressure standard for the .44 S&W special is 15,500 psi (107 MPa).

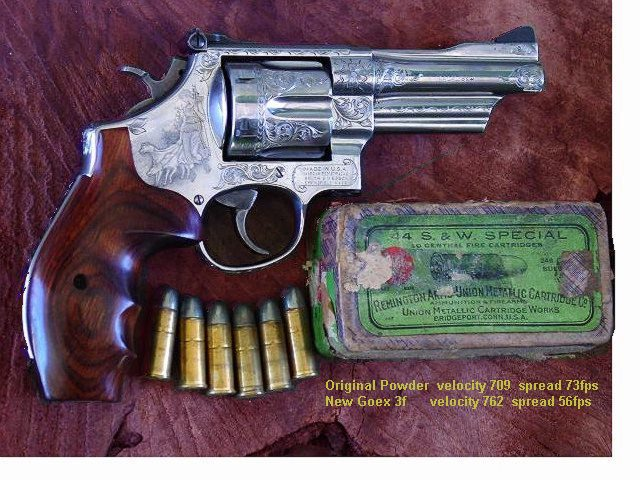
Black Powder Factory Cartridges c. 1907—20

== The .44 Associates ==
Keith Semi-Wadcutter Hollow Point developed by Elmer Keith and Harold Croft (c. 1929–1931)

Almost from its introduction, firearms enthusiasts and cartridge handloaders saw that the potential of the .44 Special chambering was far from being realized and by the end of the 1920s were loading it to much higher velocities than factory standards. Led by articles in firearms periodicals penned by gun writers such as Elmer Keith and Skeeter Skelton, a loose cadre of enthusiastic fans who called themselves the ".44 Associates" formed. Trading information such as .44 Special handloading data and tips regarding the conversion of revolvers to .44 caliber, they promulgated the belief espoused by many firearms authorities and experts that the .44 Special chambering is one of the best overall in the handguns.

== Elmer Keith and his Magnums ==
Elmer Keith, one of the most famous and popular firearms related authors at the time, developed a number of classical heavy handloads for the .44 Special; many are still highly regarded, today. He also championed the concept of higher powered big-bore revolvers with Smith & Wesson and Remington Arms, eventually leading to the development of the .357 Magnum, .41 Magnum, and .44 Magnum. Keith's suggested designation for the proposed .44 caliber round was the ".44 Special Magnum," but when Remington Arms developed the cartridge they chose to name it the .44 Remington Magnum. Nonetheless, the new cartridge was developed directly from the .44 Special design by simply lengthening the older case by .125 inch. Remington's stated rationale for the making of this change was to preclude higher pressured Magnum loads from being chambered in .44 Special revolvers.

== Usage and loadings ==
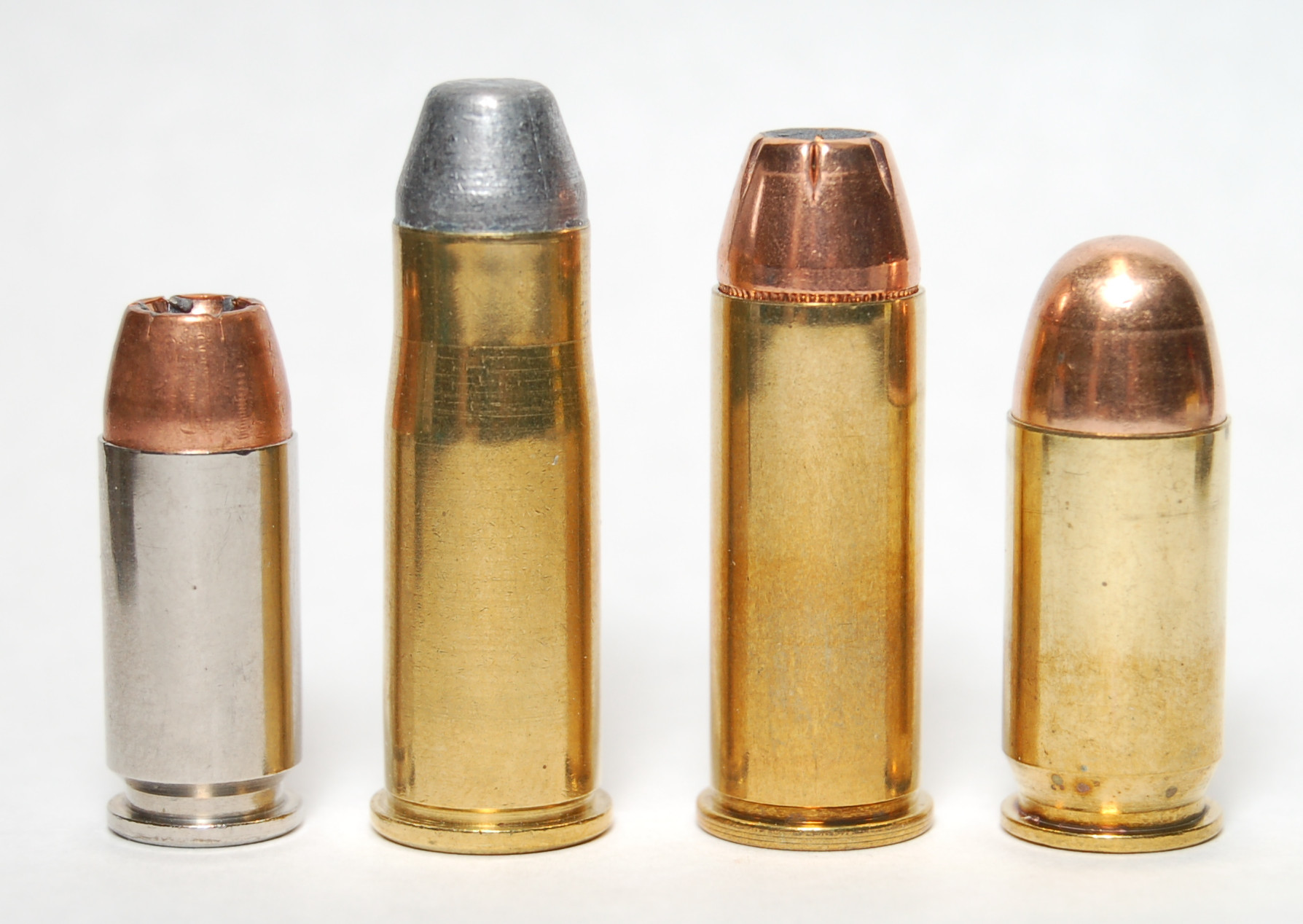
.40 S&W, .38-40, .44 Special, and .45 ACP

The hype and excitement surrounding the introduction of the .44 Magnum in the mid-1950s eclipsed the .44 Special, causing it to fall in popularity with firearms manufacturers. They offered fewer models chambered for .44 Special for several years. Recently the .44 Special has experienced something of a resurgence, since many firearms enthusiasts have realized that the heavy recoil of the Magnum round is "too much pistol" for many applications, and the heavier and more bulky revolvers chambered for it are not as convenient to carry. Another factor fueling the .44 Special's comeback is its ability to fit in the longer chambers of the .44 Magnum revolvers, much like the .38 Special fits in the longer chambers of the .357 Magnum. This makes the .44 Special cartridge an attractive alternative for reduced velocity target shooting and plinking. The popularity of cowboy action shooting has also helped pique interest in the .44 Special, motivating manufacturers to offer modern and reproduction firearms chambered for this classic cartridge.

A variety of factory ammunition loadings are available in .44 Special, including bullet weights of 135, 165, 180, 200, 240, 246, and 250 grains (8.7, 10.7, 11.7, 13.0, 15.6, 15.9, and 16.2 g) at various velocities. Special high performance terminal ballistic loads are also offered, such as the Hornady JHP, Winchester Silvertip JHP, Speer Gold Dot JHP, Federal LHP, Cor-Bon JHP, and various other jacketed hollow point and soft point designs.

== See also ==
- 10 mm caliber
- List of rimmed cartridges
- List of handgun cartridges
- List of rifle cartridges
- Table of handgun and rifle cartridges
