= Skeeter Skelton =

American lawman and writer (1928–1988)

Charles Allan "Skeeter" Skelton (May 1, 1928 – January 17, 1988) was an American lawman and firearms writer who was born in Hereford, Texas and died in El Paso, Texas. After serving in the United States Marine Corps from 1945–1946 he began a law enforcement career which included service with the United States Border Patrol, a uniformed officer with the Amarillo, Texas police department, a term as Sheriff of Deaf Smith County, Texas, and investigator with both the US Customs Service and Special Agent in Charge with the Drug Enforcement Administration. After his first nationally published article hit newsstands in September 1959, Skelton began writing part-time for firearms periodicals. In 1974 he retired from the DEA and concentrated full-time on his writing.

== Writing ==
Skelton wrote his first article for Shooting Times in 1966, in 1967 he became the handgun editor for the magazine until his death in 1988. His periodical articles were collected in Good Friends, Good Guns, Good Whiskey: Selected Works of Skeeter Skelton and Hoglegs, Hipshots and Jalapeños : Selected Works of Skeeter Skelton. He was a contemporary of Bill Jordan, Charles Askins and Elmer Keith.

Skelton's work frequently poked fun at himself. His "Me and Joe" stories of his Depression-era youth, while including references to period firearms, were character-oriented rather than technical pieces. His 'Dobe Grant' and 'Jug Johnson' short stories were perhaps the only fiction routinely published by a popular shooting magazine. His son Bart Skelton was also a gun writer.

Shooting Times magazine is currently reprinting past "Hip Shots" articles by Skelton.

== Legacy ==
Skelton is credited by firearms writer John Taffin with the revival of the .44 Special round.
