= 10 mm caliber =

Firearm cartridge classification

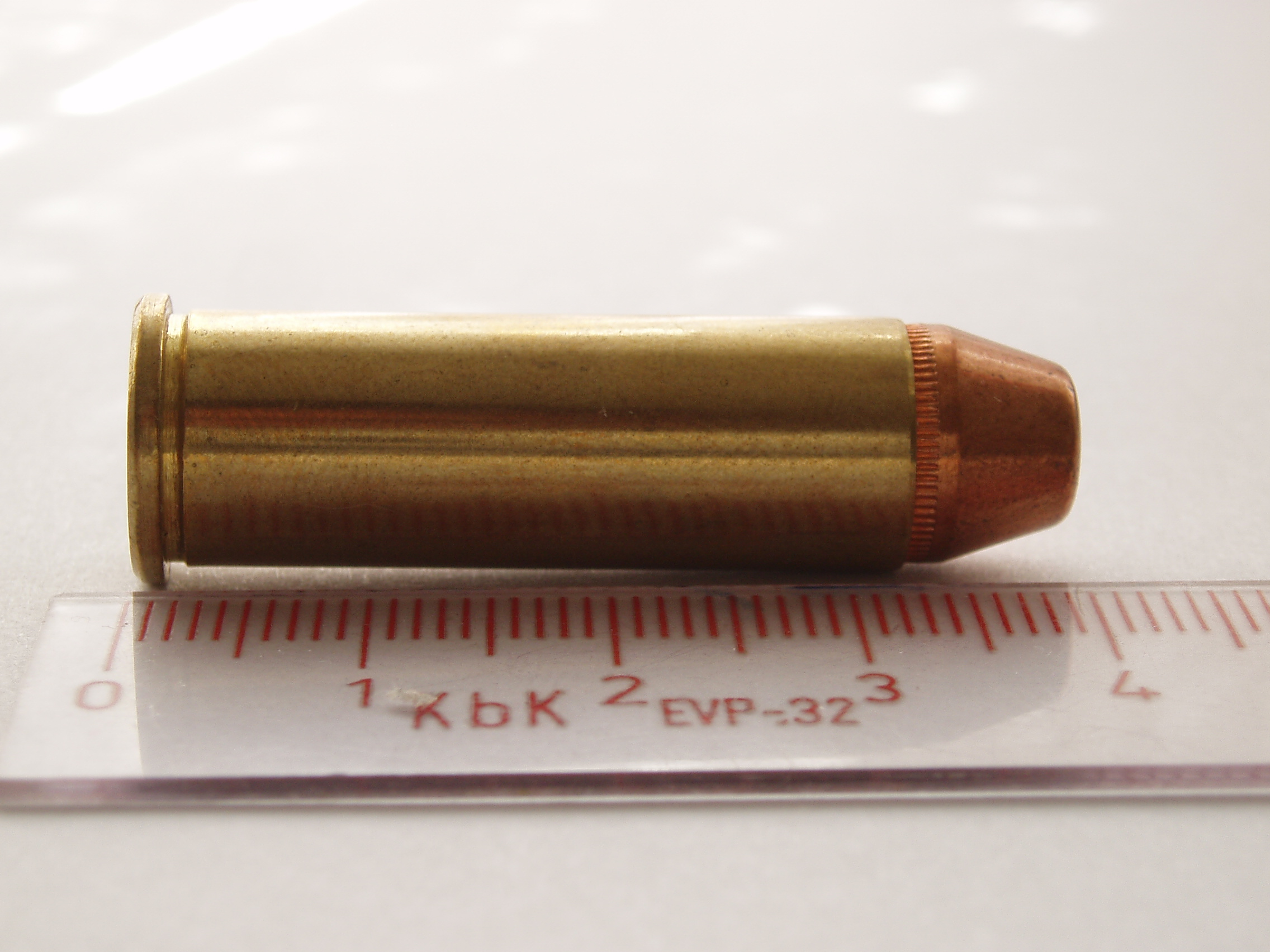
- Example of a 10 mm cartridge, a .41 Remington Magnum
- Firearm cartridges
- « 8 mm, 9 mm 10 mm 11 mm, 12 mm »

This is a list of firearm cartridges which have bullets in the 10-millimetre (0.39 in) to 10.99-millimetre (0.433 in) caliber range.

- Length refers to the cartridge case length.
- OAL refers to the overall length of the cartridge.

All measurements are in mm (in).

== Pistol cartridges ==
Name (mm/in)	Bullet diameter	Case type	Case length	Rim	Base	Shoulder	Neck	OAL
.40 S&W	10.16 (.400)	Rimless straight walled	21.59 (.850)	10.77 (.424)	10.74 (.423)	N/A	10.74 (.423)	28.83 (1.135)
.40 Super	10.16 (.400)	Rimless straight walled	25.20 (.992)	12.07 (.475)	11.96 (.471)	N/A	10.77 (.424)	32.00 (1.260)
10mm Auto	10.16 (.400)	Rimless straight walled	25.20 (.992)	10.80 (.425)	10.80 (.425)	N/A	10.74 (.423)	32.00 (1.260)
10mm Magnum	10.16 (.400)		31.88 (1.255)	10.80 (.425)	10.80 (.425)	N/A	10.74 (.423)	39.48 (1.555)
.400 Corbon	10.19 (.401)	Rimless straight walled bottlenecked	22.81 (.898)	12.0 (.471)	11.94 (.470)	11.91 (.469)	10.74 (.423)	30.48 (1.20)
.41 Action Express	10.4 (.410)	Rebated straight walled	22.10 (0.870)	9.97 (0.392)	.435 in (11.0 mm)	N/A	.434 in (11.0 mm)	29.21 (1.15)
.429 DE	10.9 (.429)	Rebated bottleneck	33 (1.299)	13.1 (.514)				
.44 AMP	10.9 (.429)		32.97 (1.298)	11.94 (.470)	11.94 (.470)		11.61 (.457)	40.77 (1.605)

== Revolver cartridges ==
Name	Bullet diameter	Case length	Neck	Rim	OAL	Base
.38-40 Winchester	10.16 (.400)	33 (1.30)	10.6 (.416)	13.2 (.520)	40 (1.59)	11.8 (.465)
.41 Short (.41 Rimfire)	10.29 (.405)	11.86 (.467)	10.31 (.406)	11.89 (.468)	23.19 (.913)	10.31 (.406)
.41 Short Colt	10.2 (.402)	16.2 (.637)	10.3 (.406)	11.5 (.451)	26.8 (1.057)	10.3 (.406)
.41 Special	10.4 (.410)	29.6 (1.165)	11.02 (.434)	12.90 (.492)	37.2 (1.465)	11.05 (.434)
.41 Magnum	10.4 (.410)	32.76 (1.290)	11.02 (.434)	12.90 (.492)	40.39 (1.590)	11.05 (.434)
.414 Super Magnum	10.4 (.410)	-	-	-	-	-
10.4 mm Italian	10.72 (.422)	-	-	-	-	-
11 mm German Serv	10.87 (.428)	-	-	-	-	-
.44 Russian	10.90 (.429)	24.64 (.970)	11.6 (.457)	13.1 (.515 in)	36 (1.43)	11.6 (.457)
.44 Special	10.90 (.429)	29.46 (1.160)	10.99 (.4325)	13.06 (.514)	41.02 (1.615)	11.61 (.457)
.44 Magnum	10.90 (.429)	32.77 (1.290)	10.97 (.432)	13.06 (.514)	40.89 (1.610)	11.61 (.457)
.445 Super Magnum	10.90 (.429)	40.89 (1.610)	10.97 (.432)	13.06 (.514)	-	11.61 (.457)

== Rifle cartridges ==
Name	Bullet diameter	Case type	Case length	Rim	Base	Shoulder	Neck	OAL
.400 Legend	10.173 (.4005)	Rebated straight walled	41.91 (1.65)	10.72 (.422)	11.176 (.440)			
.40-60 Winchester	10.3 (.405)		48 (1.89)					
.40-72 Winchester	10.3 (.406)		66 (2.598)	13.2 (.518)	11.7 (.460)	-	10.9 (.431)	80 (3.15)
.401 Winchester Self-Loading	10.34 (.4065)		38.1 (1.5)	11.68 (.490)	11.68 (.490)	-	10.99 (.432)	50.8 (2.005)
10.4×47mm Italian M/70 Centerfire (Note: Ammunition for M1870 Italian Vetterli)	10.4 (.408)	Rimmed tapered bottlenecked	47.5 (1.87)	16.1 (.634)	13.72 (.54)	13.13 (.517)	11.1 (.437)	62.48 (2.46)
.408 Chey Tac	10.4 (.408)		77 (3.04)	16.3 (.640)	16.2 (.637)	15.3 (.601)	11.1 (.438)	109.4 (4.307)
.450/400 3 inch Nitro Express	10.4 (.410)		76 (3.00)	15.6 (.613)	13.8 (.545)	13.2 (.518)	11 (.434)	95 (3.75)
.405 Winchester	10.45 (0.4115)		65.6 (2.583)	13.8 (0.543)	11.7 (0.461)	-	11.1 (0.436)	80.6 (3.175)
10.4×38mm Swiss Rimfire (Note: Ammunition for Swiss Vetterli rifle)	10.54 (.415)	Rimmed tapered bottlenecked	40.6 (1.60)	16 (.630)	13.7 (.540)	13.2 (.518)	11.1 (.437)	56 (2.20)
.416 Barrett	10.6 (.416)		83 (3.27)	20.2 (.797)	20.2 (.797)	18.6 (.732)	11.8 (.465)	116.33 (4.58)
.416 Remington Magnum	10.6 (.416)		72.39 (2.850)	13.51 (.532)	13.03 (.513)	12.37 (.487)	11.35 (.447)	91.44 (3.600)
.416 Weatherby Magnum	10.6 (.416)		73.99 (2.913)	14.70 (.579)	14.78 (.582)	14.25 (.561)	11.28 (.444)	95.25 (3.750)
.416 Rigby	10.57 (.416)		73.66 (2.90)	14.88 (.568)	14.96 (.589)	13.72 (.540)	11.33 (.446)	94.49 (3.720)
.416 Ruger	10.6 (.416)		65.3 (2.57)	13.5 (.532)	13.5 (.532)	13.1 (.515)	11.28 (.444)	91.3 (3.595)
.404 Jeffery	10.72 (.422)		73.02 (2.875)	13.79 (.543)	13.84 (.545)	13.46 (.530)	11.48 (.452)	89.66 (3.53)
10.75x68mm Mauser	10.75 (.422)		68.00 (2.677)	12.60 (.495)	12.60 (.495)	12.20 (.480)	11.50 (.453)	
.44-40 Winchester	10.85 (.427)		33.27 (1.310)	13.33 (.525)	11.96 (.471)	11.61 (.457)	11.25 (.443)	40.44 (1.592)
.444 Marlin	10.9 (.429)		56.51 (2.225)	13.05 (.514)	11.96 (.471)	-	11.51 (.453)	65.28 (2.570)

== See also ==
- .410 bore, shotgun equivalent
