= Coonan Arms =

American gun manufacturer

- Products: Gun

Coonan Arms Inc. was a gun manufacturer owned by Dan Coonan that manufactured custom 1911 handguns and FAL receivers and was based in Blaine, Minnesota.

Coonan Inc. went out of business in 2019.

== Products ==
- FAL Type 1 receiver
- Custom 1911 handguns
