= Semiwadcutter =

Type of all-purpose bullet

A semiwadcutter (SWC) or flat-nose is a type of all-purpose bullet commonly used in revolvers. The SWC combines features of the traditional round-nosed bullets and the wadcutter bullets used in target shooting, and is used in both revolver and rifle cartridges for hunting, target shooting and plinking. Full wadcutters frequently have problems reliably feeding from the magazines of semi-automatic pistols, so SWCs may be used when a true WC is desired but cannot be used for this reason.

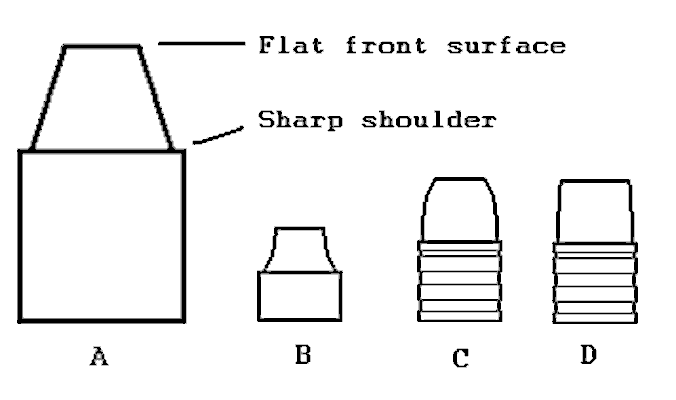
Drawings of various types of semiwadcutter bullets

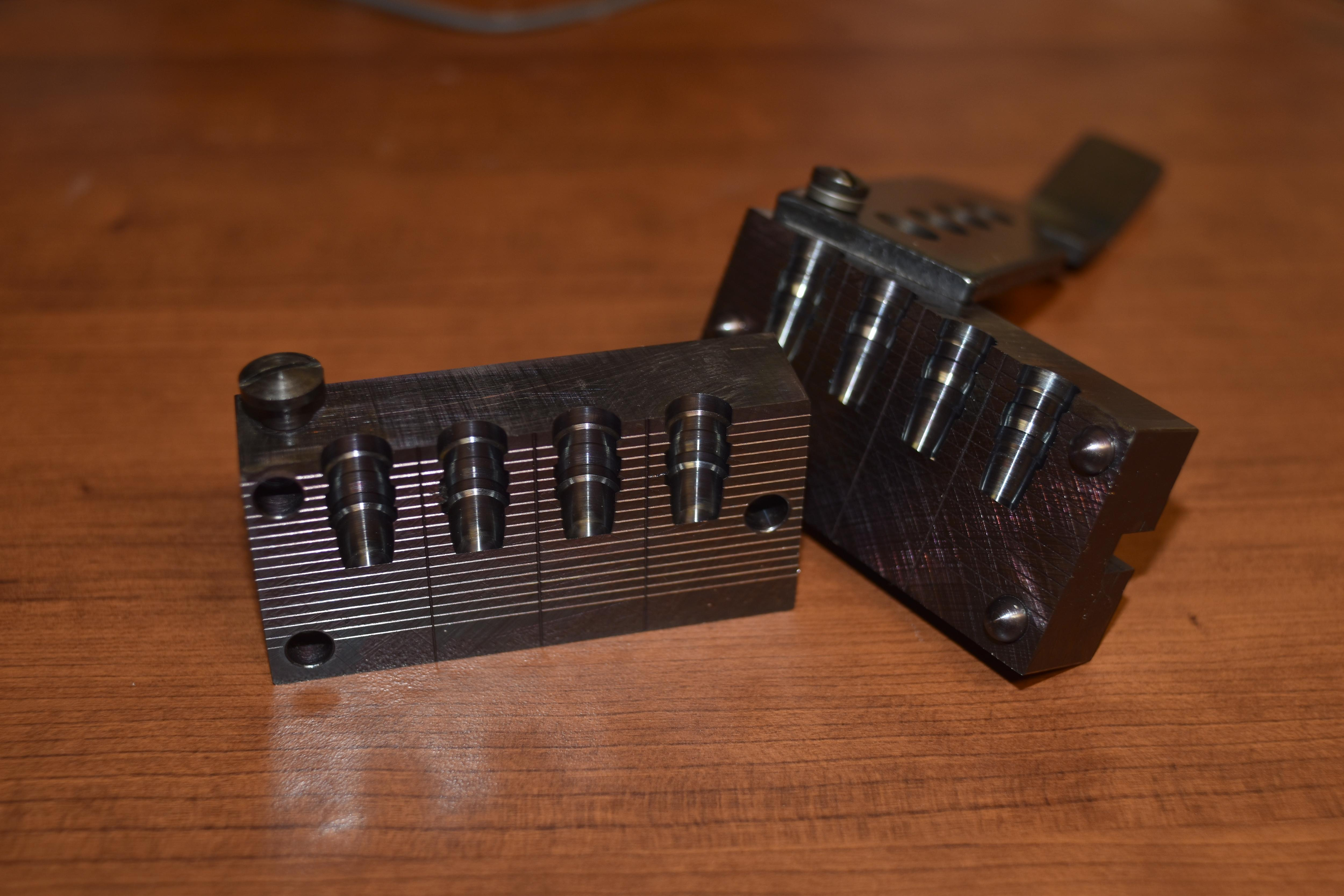
4-cavity Keith semiwadcutter bullet mold, the Lyman 358429

The semiwadcutter design consists of a roughly conical shape with the tip truncated flat (called a meplat), sitting on a cylinder (A at right). The base of the cone is slightly smaller in diameter than the cylinder, leaving a sharp shoulder. The flat nose punches a clean hole in the target, rather than stretching/tearing it like a round nose bullet would, and the sharp shoulder enlarges the hole neatly, allowing easy and accurate scoring of the target. A hunting flat nosed cast bullet will hold together without expanding and carry a large amount of air envelope with it causing a great amount of cavitation and wounding. Since it is cavitation that does most of the damage when a bullet strikes a game animal this means the flat nose bullet is an extremely effective hunting design. The SWC design offers better external ballistics than the wadcutter, as its conical nose produces less drag than the flat cylinder. A typical modification is to alter the conical section to make the sides concave, to reduce the bullet mass, or convex, to increase it. B shows a concave sided SWC, typical of a lightweight .45 ACP bullet used in bullseye shooting. The concave sides reduce the bullet weight, and thus the recoil, while keeping the overall length of the bullet long enough to feed reliably in a semi-automatic pistol such as the M1911 commonly found in bullseye competitions.

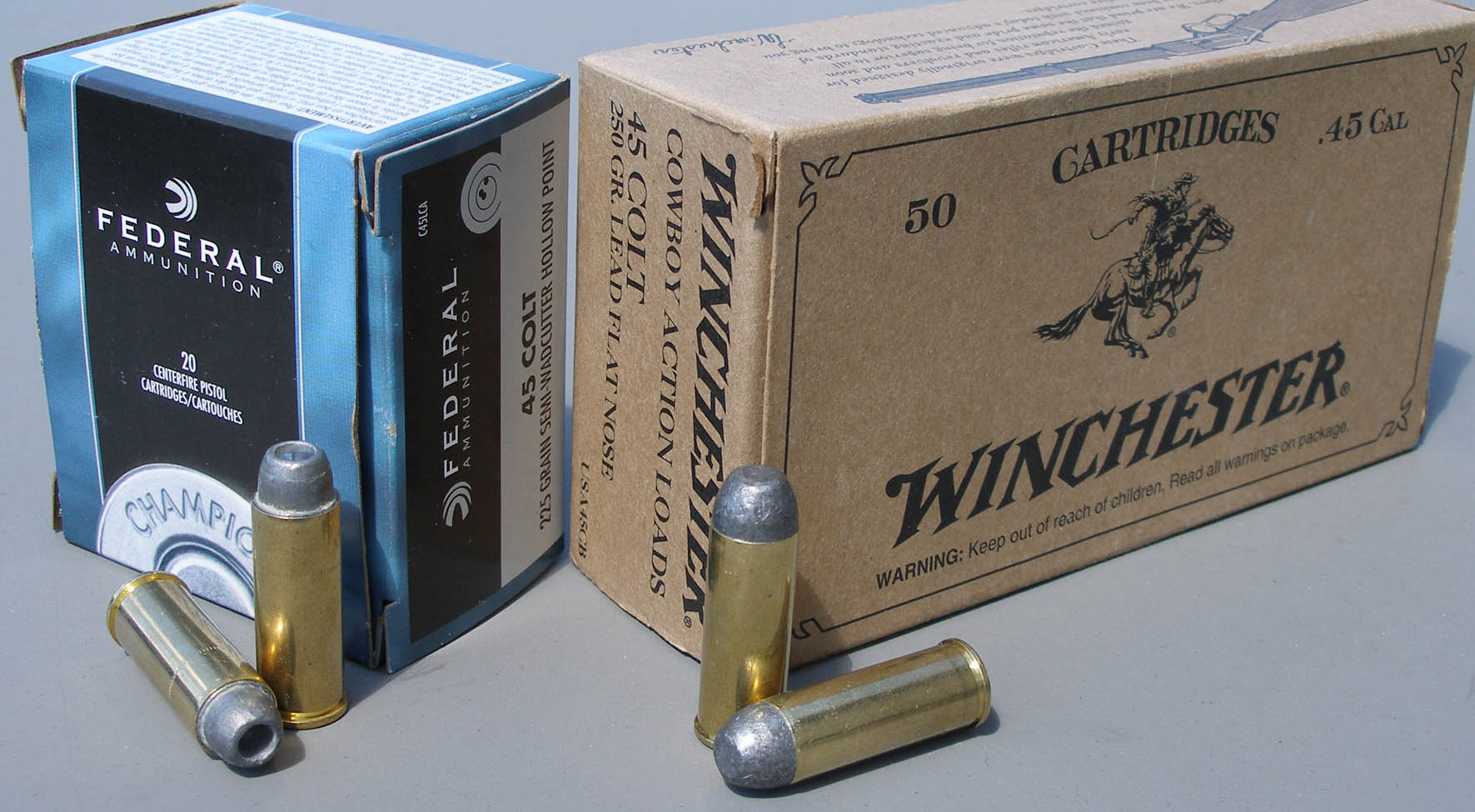

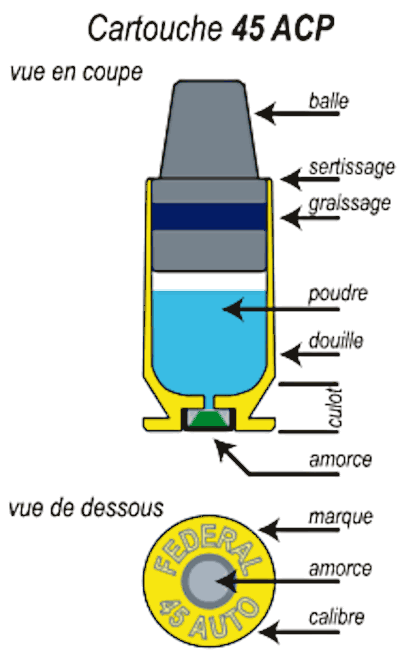

Some of the most famous SWC designs were developed by Elmer Keith for use in handgun hunting. These designs (C) use a wider front, and convex sides on the "cone" in front. This puts more weight in the front of the bullet, allowing a heavier bullet with no reduction in case capacity. Since Keith was a prime motivating force in the development of the first magnum handgun cartridge, the .357 Magnum, he was very interested in maximizing the amount of case volume for the slower burning powders needed to push heavy bullets at high velocities. The choice of bullet for the .357 Magnum cartridge varied during its development. During the development at Smith & Wesson, the original Keith bullet was modified slightly, to the form of the Sharpe bullet, which itself was based upon the Keith bullet, but which had 5/6 of the bearing surface of the Keith bullet, Keith bullets typically being made oversized and sized down. Winchester, however, upon experimenting further during the cartridge development, modified the Sharpe bullet shape slightly, while keeping the Sharpe contour of the bullet. The final choice of bullet for the .357 Magnum was thus based on the earlier Keith and Sharpe bullets, while additionally having slight differences from both.

The Keith-style SWC has been taken even further, to produce designs that are nearly wadcutters in shape (D), but are intended for large game hunting with handguns. These have nearly cylindrical noses, which are as long as the firearm chamber allows, and just slightly smaller than bore diameter so they will easily chamber. The massive nose provides a large surface area for producing large wound channels, resulting in rapid incapacitation, and the heavy bullet provides excellent penetration. The wide nose is less prone to deformation than a narrow nose, allowing the bullet to keep its shape and continue to penetrate even if it encounters bone.

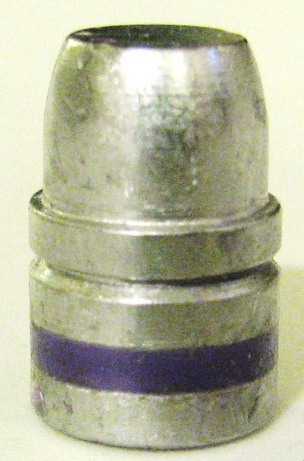
Keith-style SWC

Originally Keith specified a meplat that was 65% of the bullet caliber, but later increased it to a 70% meplat. The other distinguishing characteristics of a "Keith-style" SWC are a double radius ogive, beveled crimp groove, three equal width driving bands, wide square bottomed grease groove, and a plain base with sharp corners. The wide forward driving band helps keep the bullet aligned as it jumps across the cylinder gap. Because of the three wide equal width driving bands, the total bearing surface is greater than half the overall length of the bullet. This large bearing surface helps the Keith-style SWC to be an inherently accurate bullet, and minimizes leading from gas blow-by. The wide square bottom grease groove holds ample lubricant.
