= .357 Magnum =

Revolver cartridge

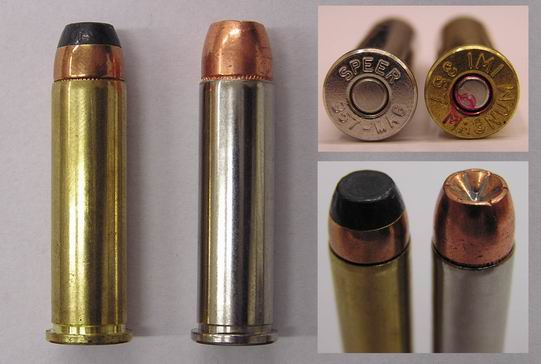
- .357 Magnum ammunition
- Type: Handgun, Carbine
- Place of origin: United States

Production history
- Designer: Elmer Keith; Phillip B. Sharpe; Douglas B. Wesson
- Designed: 1934
- Manufacturer: Smith & Wesson; Winchester
- Produced: 1935–present

Specifications
- Parent case: .38 Special
- Case type: Rimmed, straight
- Bullet diameter: .357 in (9.1 mm)
- Land diameter: .346 in (8.8 mm)
- Neck diameter: .379 in (9.6 mm)
- Base diameter: .379 in (9.6 mm)
- Rim diameter: .440 in (11.2 mm)
- Rim thickness: .060 in (1.5 mm)
- Case length: 1.29 in (33 mm)
- Overall length: 1.59 in (40 mm)
- Case capacity: 26.2 gr H_{2}O (1.70 cm^{3})
- Primer type: Small pistol magnum
- Maximum pressure (CIP): 44,000 psi (300 MPa)
- Maximum pressure (SAAMI): 35,000 psi (240 MPa)
- Maximum CUP: 45,000 CUP

Ballistic performance
Bullet mass/type	Velocity	Energy
125 gr (8 g) JHP Federal	1,450 ft/s (440 m/s)	583 ft⋅lbf (790 J)
158 gr (10 g) JHP Federal	1,240 ft/s (380 m/s)	539 ft⋅lbf (731 J)
180 gr (12 g) HC Buffalo Bore	1,400 ft/s (430 m/s)	783 ft⋅lbf (1,062 J)
200 gr (13 g) Double Tap	1,200 ft/s (370 m/s)	640 ft⋅lbf (870 J)
- Test barrel length: 4 in (102 mm) (vented); Sources: Federal,

The .357 Smith & Wesson Magnum, .357 S&W Magnum, .357 Magnum, or 9×33mmR is a rimmed, smokeless powder cartridge with a 0.357 in (9.07 mm) bullet diameter. It was created by Elmer Keith, Phillip B. Sharpe, and Douglas B. Wesson of firearm manufacturers Smith & Wesson and Winchester. The .357 Magnum cartridge is notable for its highly effective terminal ballistics.

The .357 Magnum cartridge is a magnum cartridge based on Smith & Wesson's earlier .38 Special cartridge. It was introduced in 1935 and has seen widespread use.

== Design ==
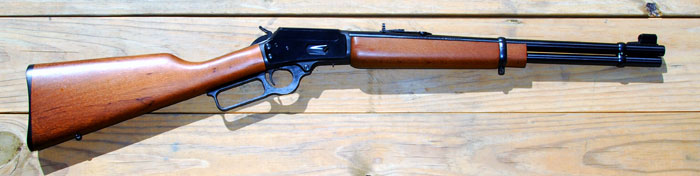
Marlin Model 1894C – a carbine in .357 Magnum that is a companion to revolvers

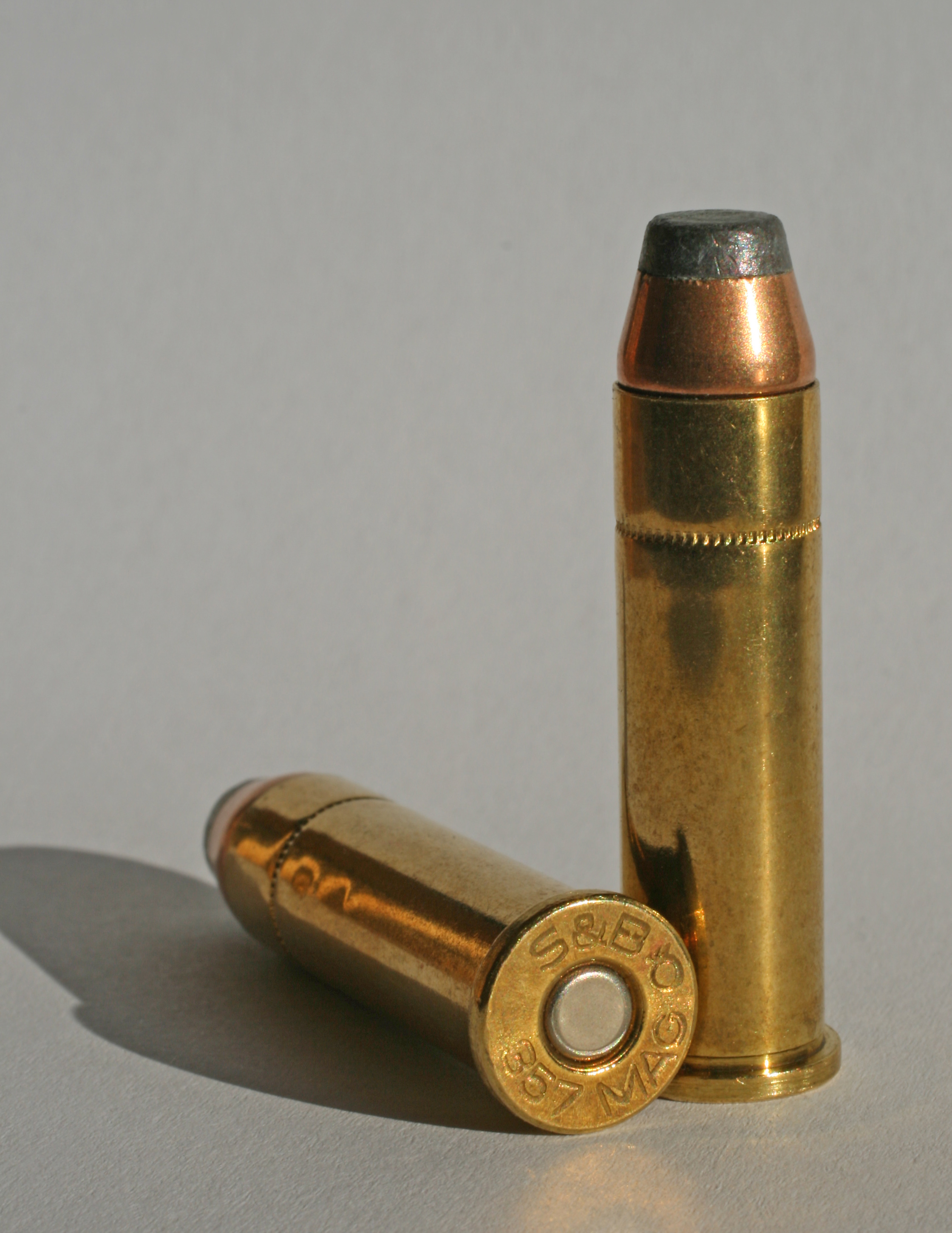
Two .357 Magnum cartridges showing bottom and side views

=== Origins of the cartridge ===
The .357 Magnum was collaboratively developed in the early to mid-1930s by a group of individuals as a direct response to Colt's .38 Super Automatic. At the time, the .38 Super was the only American pistol cartridge capable of defeating automobile cover and the early ballistic vests emerging in the Interwar period. Tests at the time revealed that those vests defeated any handgun bullet traveling less than about 1,000 feet per second (300 m/s). Colt's .38 Super Automatic just edged over that velocity and was able to penetrate car doors and vests that bootleggers and gangsters were employing as cover.

=== Connection to the .38 Special ===
Despite the difference in naming convention, the .38 Special and .357 Magnum fire the same 0.357 inches (9.07 mm) diameter bullets. The .38 Special nomenclature relates to the previous use of heeled bullets (such as the .38 Short Colt and .38 Long Colt), which were the same diameter as the case. The only external dimensional difference between .38 Special and .357 Magnum is the case length; this was done to prevent the accidental loading of .357 Magnum cartridges into .38 Special revolvers, which are not always designed for the .357 Magnum's higher chamber pressure. Case volume was not a factor in the increase in case length, as the .38 Special cartridge was originally a black-powder cartridge, while the .357 Magnum was developed using much denser smokeless powder.

=== Early experiments and Elmer Keith ===
Much credit for the .357's early development is given to hunter and experimenter Elmer Keith. Keith's early work in loading the .38 Special to increasingly higher pressure levels was made possible by the availability of heavy, target-shooting–oriented revolvers like the Smith & Wesson .38-44 "Heavy Duty" and "Outdoorsman", .38-caliber revolvers built on .44-caliber frames. The .38-44 HV load used the .38-Special cartridge loaded to a much higher velocity than standard .38-Special ammunition. The .38-44 revolvers were made by using a .44 Special size gun with the barrel bored to accept .357-caliber bullets (the true bullet diameter of the .38 Special) and the cylinder bored to accept .3801–.3809-inch-diameter (9.65–9.67 mm) cartridges (where the name "38 Special" originated). Since the frame, cylinder, and barrel were much stronger than the standard .38 Special components, it was capable of withstanding much higher pressures. The .38-44 HV round, while no longer available, was in most cases the equal of the later .357 Magnum, which works at more than double the pressure of standard .38 Special.

=== Safety considerations ===
The .357 Magnum addresses safety issues posed by earlier cartridges. Lengthening the cartridge by approximately 1/8 inch (3.2 mm) prevents the high-pressure .357 cartridge from chambering (fitting) in a firearm designed for the shorter, lower-pressure .38 Special. Elmer Keith contributed the Keith-style bullet, which increased the mass of bullet located outside the cartridge case, while leaving more room inside the case for powder. The Keith bullet employed a large, flat meplat for rapid energy transfer to improve wounding capacity. Because this bullet design does not deform like a hollow point, it achieves greater penetration. These characteristics of the Keith bullet make it suitable both for hunting and target shooting.

=== Development by Smith & Wesson ===
To reassert itself as the leading law-enforcement armament provider, Smith & Wesson developed the .357 Magnum, with Douglas B. Wesson (grandson of co-founder Daniel B. Wesson) leading the effort within Smith & Wesson, along with considerable technical assistance from Phillip B. Sharpe, a member of the technical division staff of the National Rifle Association of America. The new round was developed from Smith & Wesson's existing .38 Special round. It used a different powder load, and ultimately the case was extended by 1/8 inch (3.2 mm). The case extension was more a matter of safety than of necessity. Because the .38 Special and the early experimental .357 Magnum cartridges loaded by Keith were identical in physical attributes, it was possible to load an experimental .357 Magnum cartridge into a .38 Special revolver, with potentially disastrous results. To address this, Smith & Wesson slightly extended the case, making it impossible to chamber the Magnum-power round in a gun not designed to handle the additional pressure.

=== Bullet design ===
The choice of bullet for the .357 Magnum cartridge varied during its development. During the development at Smith & Wesson, the original Keith bullet was modified slightly to the form of the Sharpe bullet, which itself had been based upon the Keith bullet, but which had 5/6 of the bearing surface of the Keith bullet, Keith bullets typically being made oversized and sized down. Winchester, however, upon further experimentation during cartridge development, slightly modified the Sharpe bullet shape while retaining its overall contour. The final choice of bullet was thus based on the earlier bullet designs, which differed slightly from one another.

== Dimensions ==
The .357 Magnum has 1.66 milliliter (26.2 grain H_{2}O) cartridge case capacity.

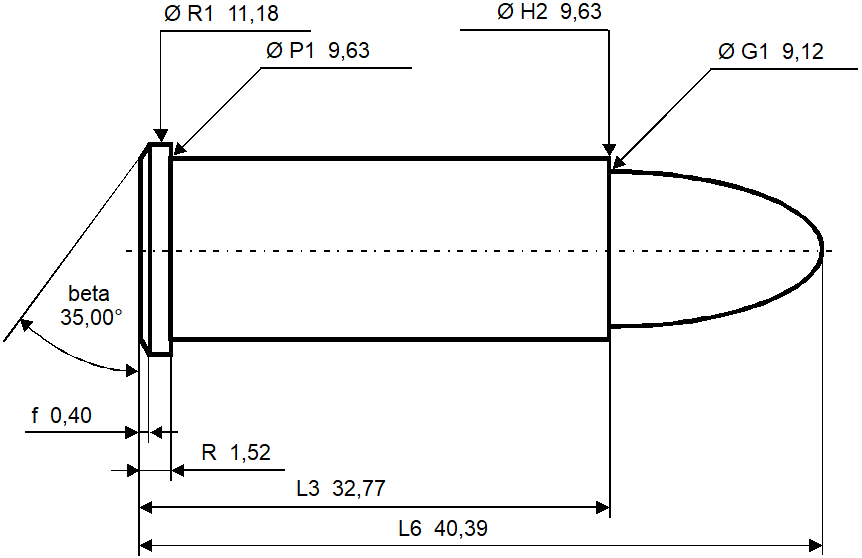

.357 Magnum maximum C.I.P. cartridge dimensions. All sizes in millimeters (mm)

The cartridge headspaces on the rim of the case. The common rifling twist rate for this cartridge is 476 mm (1 in 18.74 in), six grooves, ø lands = 8.79 mm, ø grooves = 9.02 mm, land width = 2.69 mm, and the primer type is small pistol magnum.

According to the C.I.P. rulings, the .357 Magnum cartridge case can handle up to 300 MPa (44,000 psi) P_{max} piezo pressure. In C.I.P.-regulated countries, every pistol cartridge combination has to be proofed at 130% of this maximum C.I.P. pressure to certify for sale to consumers. This means that .357 Magnum-chambered arms in C.I.P.-regulated countries are currently proof-tested at 390 MPa (57,000 psi) PE piezo pressure.

== Performance ==
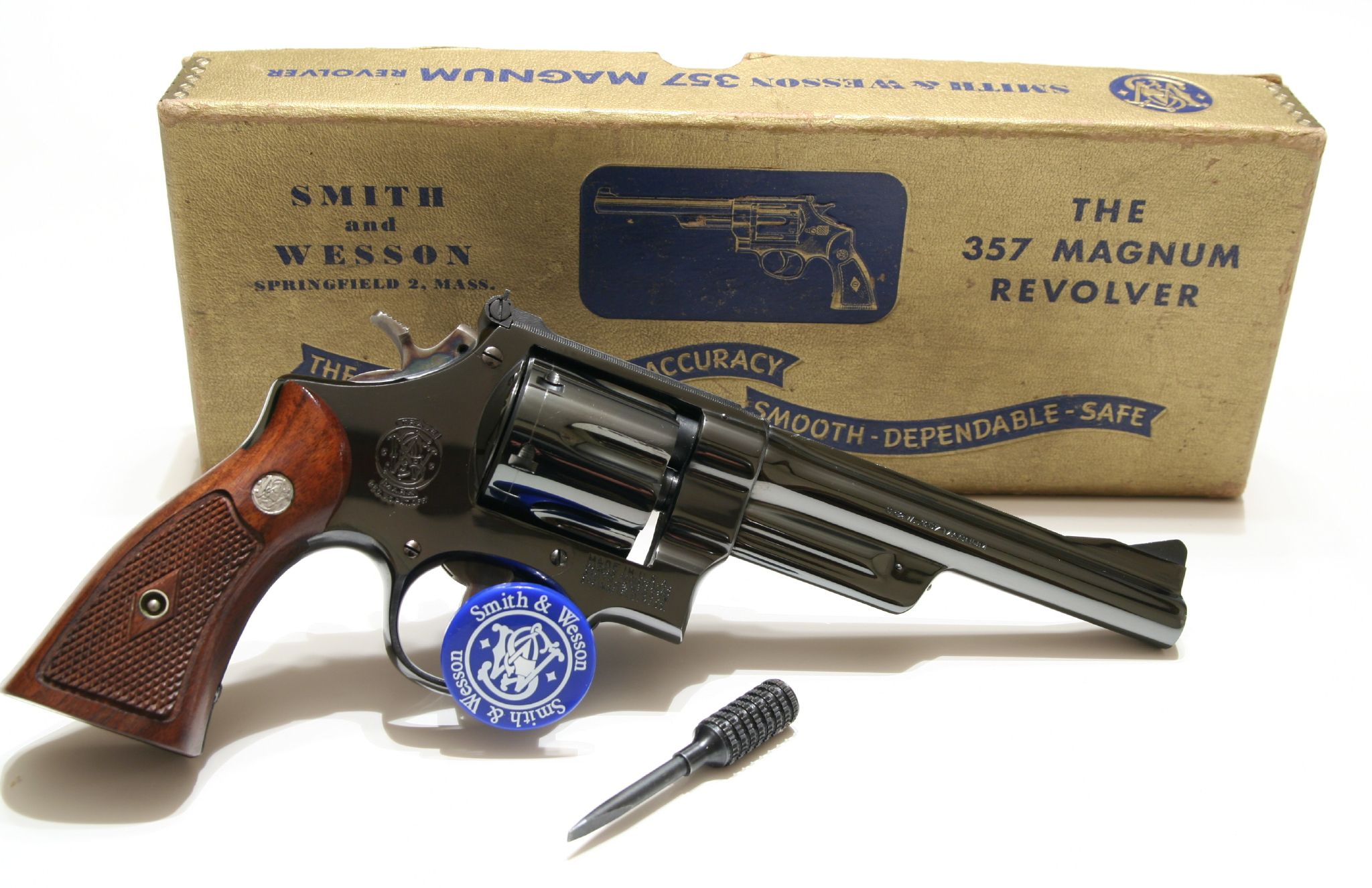
Introduced in 1935, the large frame Smith & Wesson Model 27 was the first revolver chambered for the .357 Magnum cartridge.

The .357 Magnum cartridge is used for hunting, metallic silhouette, and self-defense round. With specific loadings, it has been used against larger game, such as bear and ungulates. The .357 Magnum has less energy than larger magnum revolver cartridges and a smaller diameter with higher velocity. It is used for small- to medium-sized game, including deer. At 100 yards (91 m), the .357 Magnum has a higher velocity than the .38 Special at the muzzle. The cartridge is also used for plinking and target shooting.

The original .357 Magnum load was a 158 gr (10.2 g) lead bullet with an advertised muzzle velocity of 1,510 ft/s (460 m/s) and muzzle energy of 800 ft⋅lbf (1,100 J). (Muzzle velocity was taken using a large frame revolver with a fairly long barrel of 8.75 in (222 mm)) When jacketed bullets were introduced by Remington in 1963, the velocity was boosted to 1550 ft/s from a 8.38 inch barrel. When that same ammunition was fired in a 4.0 inch vented barrel in 1976/1977, velocity dropped to 1235 ft/s. Some people interpret this to mean that the modern loads have been reduced, but they have not. It's just recorded from a shorter barrel. Today's C.I.P.-compliant loads can duplicate the original mid-1930s load. When using a revolver with a shorter 7 in (178 mm) barrel, today's C.I.P. conform maximum loads with a 158 gr (10.2 g) bullet can reach a muzzle velocity of 1,502 ft/s (458 m/s).

For a handgun cartridge, the bolt thrust is a factor in weapons design at C.I.P. conform maximum loads. Revolvers chambered in .357 Magnum can also chamber and fire the shorter .38 Special cartridge. Compared to the .357 Magnum, the .38 Special has lower recoil, noise, and muzzle flash. The use of .38 Special cartridges in .357 Magnum revolvers is common. However, .38 Special ammunition is not typically used in .357 Magnum semi-automatic firearms or rifles, as these require sufficient recoil energy to cycle the action.

The .357 Magnum has also become popular as a "dual-use" cartridge in short, light rifles like the American Old West lever-actions. In a rifle, the bullet will exit the barrel at about 1,800 feet per second (550 m/s), making it far more versatile than the .30 Carbine or the .32-20 Winchester. In the 1930s, it was found to be very effective against steel car doors and ballistic vests, and metal-penetrating rounds were once popular in the United States among highway patrol, state police, sheriffs and other police agencies. The .357 Magnum revolver has been largely replaced by semi-automatic pistols for police use. However, it is still very popular as a backup gun and among outdoorspeople, security guards, and civilians for hunting, metallic silhouette, target shooting, and self-defense. The 9mm Winchester Magnum, which is also known as the 9×29mm, was developed to duplicate the performance of the .357 Magnum in a semi-automatic pistol, as was the .357 SIG cartridge.

Some common performance parameters are shown in the table below for several .357 Magnum loads. Bullet weights ranging from 100 to 200 grains (6.5 to 13.0 g) are common. The 125 grains (8.1 g) jacketed hollow-point loads are popular for self-defense, whereas heavier loads are commonly used for hunting. Loads are available with energies typically from 400 to 800 foot-pounds force (542 to 1,085 joules) and can be selected for various applications based on desired use and risk assessments.

Manufacturer	Load	Mass	Velocity	Energy	Expansion	Penetration	PC	TSC
American	Quik-Shok JHP	125 gr (8.1 g)	1,409 ft/s (429.5 m/s)	551 ft⋅lbf (747.1 J)	fragment	9.0 in (228.6 mm)	2.7 cu in (44.2 cm^{3})	47.5 cu in (778.4 cm^{3})
ATOMIC Ammunition	Bonded match hollow point	158 gr (10.2 g)	1,350 ft/s (411.5 m/s)	640 ft⋅lbf (867.7 J)	0.71 in (18.0 mm)	15 in (381.0 mm)	X	X
Double Tap	Gold Dot JHP	125 gr (8.1 g)	1,600 ft/s (487.7 m/s)	711 ft⋅lbf (964.0 J)	0.69 in (17.5 mm)	12.75 in (323.8 mm)	4.8 cu in (78.7 cm^{3})	69.3 cu in (1,135.6 cm^{3}) (est)
Federal	Classic JHP	125 gr (8.1 g)	1,450 ft/s (442.0 m/s)	584 ft⋅lbf (791.8 J)	0.65 in (16.5 mm)	12.0 in (304.8 mm)	4.0 cu in (65.5 cm^{3})	79.8 cu in (1,307.7 cm^{3})
Remington	Golden Saber JHP	125 gr (8.1 g)	1,220 ft/s (371.9 m/s)	413 ft⋅lbf (560.0 J)	0.60 in (15.2 mm)	13.0 in (330.2 mm)	3.7 cu in (60.6 cm^{3})	30.4 cu in (498.2 cm^{3})
Remington	Semiwadcutter	158 gr (10.2 g)	1,235 ft/s (376.4 m/s)	535 ft⋅lbf (725.4 J)	0.36 in (9.1 mm)	27.5 in (698.5 mm)	2.8 cu in (45.9 cm^{3})	12.9 cu in (211.4 cm^{3})
Winchester	Silvertip JHP	145 gr (9.4 g)	1,290 ft/s (393.2 m/s)	536 ft⋅lbf (726.7 J)	0.65 in (16.5 mm)	14.3 in (363.2 mm)	4.7 cu in (77.0 cm^{3})	33.7 cu in (552.2 cm^{3})

Key:
Expansion – expanded bullet diameter (ballistic gelatin)
Penetration – penetration depth (ballistic gelatin)
PC – permanent cavity volume (ballistic gelatin, FBI method)
TSC – temporary stretch cavity volume (ballistic gelatin)

== Comparison ==
The .357 Magnum cartridge has accuracy potential comparable to that of the .38 Special wadcutter round, which is often regarded as a benchmark for precision shooting. Revolvers chambered for .357 Magnum can also fire .38 Special wadcutter ammunition with good accuracy. This combination of precision, power, and the ability to use less-expensive, lower-recoil .38 Special cartridges contributes to the versatility of .357 Magnum revolvers. As a result, they are used in a range of shooting activities, from short-range precision shooting at approximately 20 yards (18 m) to longer-range falling-plate competitions. The cartridge is also commonly chosen by individuals who handload ammunition, as it is relatively economical to reload and is known for consistent performance.

The .357 Magnum was developed from the earlier .38 Special. This was possible because the .38 Special was introduced in 1898 and originally designed to use black powder, which requires two to five times as much powder by volume to produce the same velocity with the same bullet as smokeless powder. Thus, the .38 Special has a relatively large case capacity, and for lower pressures (121 MPa (17,500 psi) P_{max} piezo pressure). The 9×19mm Parabellum was introduced in 1902 and was originally designed to use smokeless powder, and for higher pressures (235 MPa (34,100 psi) P_{max} piezo pressure). It therefore produces considerably more energy than the .38, despite its case having less than half the powder capacity. Many .38 Special loads use the same powders at similar charge weights, but because the case is so much larger, light-target loads with fast-burning powders may only fill the case about 1/8 full. Filling the case with slower-burning powders produces much more power, but also much more pressure; far too much pressure for older, smaller-frame revolvers chambered in .38 Special. It was to accommodate these high-pressure, high-power loads that the longer .357 Magnum, together with the stronger revolvers designed to handle it, was developed.

The .357 SIG, developed in 1994, was named "357" to highlight its intended purpose: to duplicate the performance of 125-grain (8.1 g) .357 Magnum loads fired from 4-inch-barreled (102 mm) revolvers, in a cartridge designed to be used in a semi-automatic pistol.

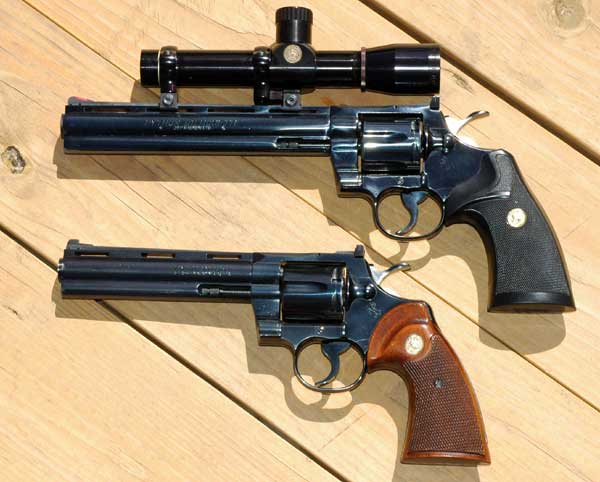
Colt Pythons in 8" and 6" barrels

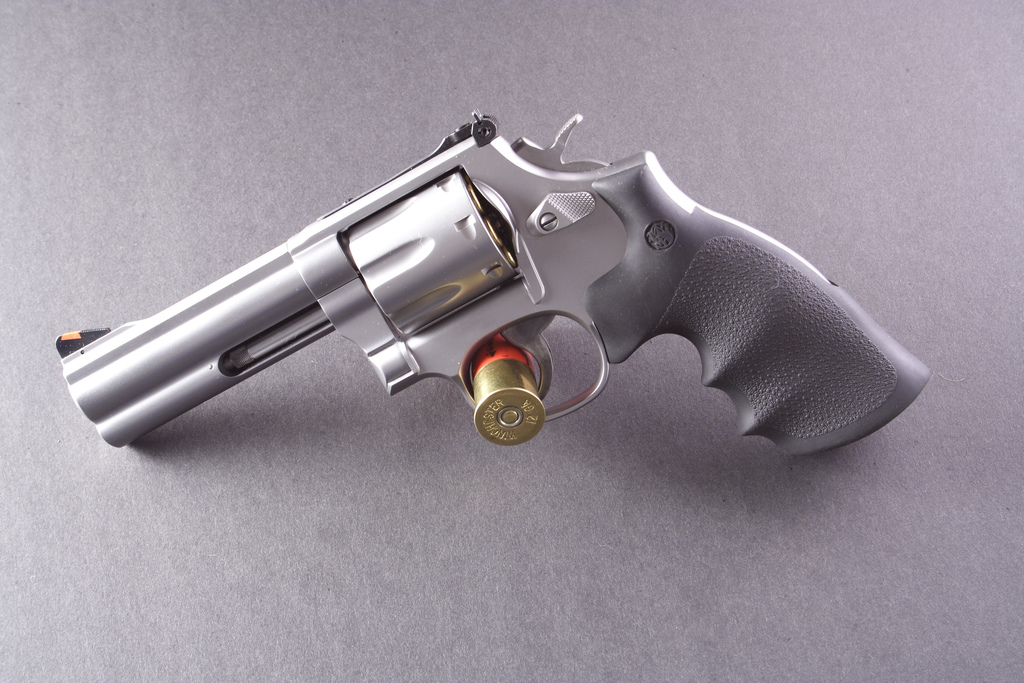
Smith & Wesson Model 686

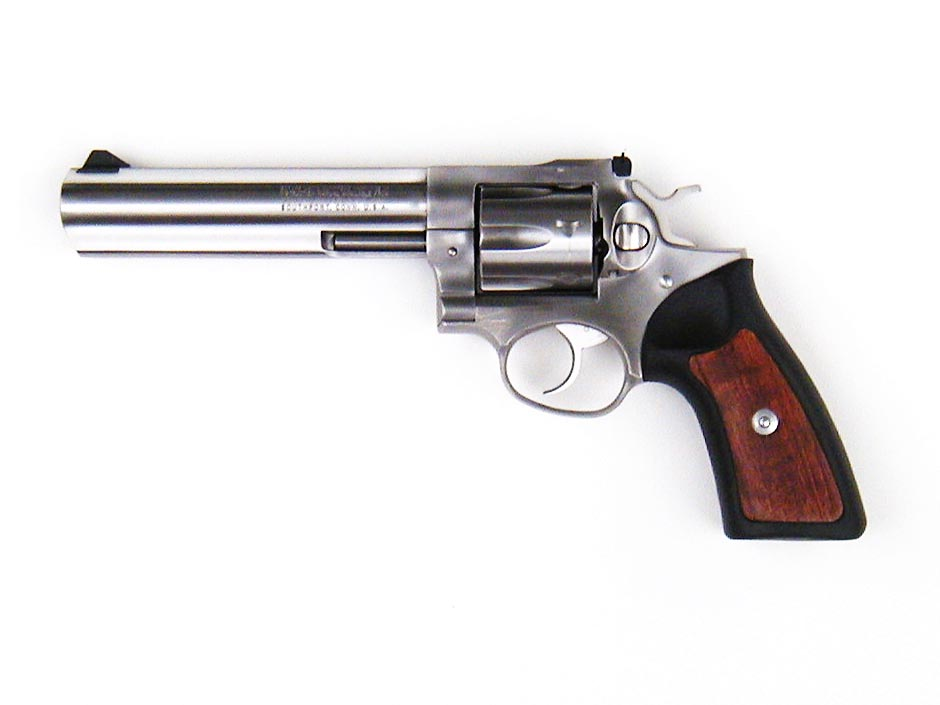
Ruger GP100 (mod. KGP-161)

== See also ==
- .357 AMP
- .357 Remington Maximum
- .357 SuperMag
- .327 Federal Magnum
- 9×25mm Mauser
- 9×29mm, 9×30mm Grom – similar rimless cartridges
- Coonan Arms
- Table of handgun and rifle cartridges
