= Elmer Keith =

American rancher and handgun developer (1899–1984)

- Born: March 8, 1899; Hardin, Missouri, U.S.
- Died: February 14, 1984 (aged 84); Boise, Idaho, U.S.
- Occupations: Rancher, author, firearms enthusiast
- Known for: Creation of the .357 Magnum, .44 Magnum, and .41 Magnum cartridges
- Spouse: Loraine Randall

Elmer Merrifield Keith (March 8, 1899 – February 14, 1984) was an American rancher, firearms enthusiast, and author. Keith was instrumental in the development of the first magnum revolver cartridge, the .357 Magnum (1935), as well as the later .44 Magnum (1956) and .41 Magnum (1964) cartridges, credited by Roy G. Jinks as "the father of big bore handgunning." Keith was born in Hardin, Missouri, and overcame serious injuries that he had sustained at age 12 in a fire when he was living in Missoula, Montana.

== Career ==
During World War II, Keith served as an inspector at the Ogden, Utah, Arsenal. The rifles that he inspected were cartouche stamped with the initials "OGEK" in a rectangular box, on the buttstock. Rifles stamped OGEK without a rectangular box were inspected by Ed Klouser at the same Ogden Arsenal.

=== Magnum revolvers ===
Keith's first major contribution, the.357 Magnum, was the result of handloading the .38 Special cartridge far beyond normally accepted limits, taking full advantage of the greater material strength of the revolvers available in the 1920s and 1930s compared to those of the late 19th century. The.357 Magnum first became available in 1935 and quickly became a favorite among law enforcement and civilian users. The.357 Magnum had a slightly longer case than the .38 Special, but was otherwise identical, so .357 Magnum revolvers could shoot .38 Special or .357 Magnum ammunition, but .38 Special revolvers (most of which are not safe for the pressures generated by the Magnum round) could not chamber .357 Magnum ammunition. Buying a .357 Magnum revolver gave the shooter all the abilities of the well-established .38 Special, with the ability to increase the available power by using the Magnum cartridge. Keith's contributions to the commercial development of the .357 Magnum have been questioned by some writers, and Keith subsequently denigrated the .357 Magnum as he had the .38 Special.

The .44 Magnum was developed in much the same way and was released commercially in 1956. Keith had earlier determined that the thinner chamber walls of the .45 Colt would not comfortably withstand the pressures generated by his own heavy loads. He therefore started experimenting with the .44 Special revolver and used the same formula of pushing heavy bullets at high velocities that he had used for the .357 Magnum. The resulting ".44 Special Magnum" was a formidable cartridge for handgun hunting, firing a 250 grain bullet at 1,200 ft/s (370 m/s).

Keith encouraged Smith & Wesson and Remington to produce a commercial version of this new high pressure loading, and revolvers chambered for it. While S&W produced the first prototype revolver chambered in .44 Magnum, the famous Model 29, arms maker Sturm, Ruger & Co., actually beat S&W to market by several months in 1956 with a .44 Magnum version of the single action Blackhawk revolver. In fact, Remington delivered a more powerful cartridge than Keith asked for, firing a 240 grain bullet at 1,500 ft/s (460 m/s), and it remained the most powerful production handgun cartridge until the commercial introduction of the .454 Casull (based on the .45 Colt). The .44 Magnum is still far more popular, as the recoil of .454 Casull rounds is considered excessive by most shooters, and revolvers in .454 Casull were rare and expensive until the introduction of .454 Casull models by Sturm, Ruger and Taurus in the late 1990s.

The .41 Magnum, released in 1964, was an attempt to reach a middle ground between the .357 and .44 Magnum cartridges. The .357 Magnum was adequate for hunting deer-sized game, but the limited power meant it needed to be used by a skilled marksman. The .44 Magnum provided far more power, easily taking deer-sized game, but recoil and muzzle blast are substantial, at least in the earliest commercial loadings. The .41 Magnum, inspired by the older, obsolete .41 Long Colt Cartridge, was intended to provide more power than the .357 Magnum with less recoil and muzzle blast than the .44 Magnum. The .41 Magnum used a completely new case (unlike the .357 Magnum and .44 Magnum which were based on existing cases) and used a .410" bullet instead of the earlier .41 Colt and .38-40's roughly .400" diameter bullet, while pushing the new .410" bullet to similar velocities as achieved by the .357 and .44 Magnum bullets. However, while there was (and still is) a small community of shooters preferring the .41 Magnum, the round failed to achieve a similar high degree of popularity. Some police, to whom the .41 Magnum was initially marketed, were happy with the .38 Special or .357 Magnum, and many officers had no interest in anything more powerful, which also delivered greater blast and recoil that could place the shooter at a disadvantage in a gunfight requiring fast follow-up shots. Some police departments adopted the 41 Magnum with a reduced load designed for police use and were quite happy the added power required only one hit to put an opponent down. Hunters likewise stayed with the more commonly available .44 Magnum, which could be used with full power factory loads, less powerful handloads, or commercial .44 Special ammunition as needed.

Keith regarded the handgun as a weapon of opportunity. He was incredibly skilled with it, and once hit a rifle-wounded deer several times at a range of 600 yards (550 m) using his 6½ inch S&W Model 29. It was part of the Keith collection, which was sold auction in 2015.

Keith is also famous for designing and commissioning his No. 5 revolver, fashioned by R. F. Sedgeley, in 1928.

=== Keith-style bullets ===
Keith was responsible for a number of still popular bullet designs, and collectively called "Keith style" bullets. These bullets were based on the semiwadcutter (SWC) design, but using a wider than normal front surface, and convex sides. These changes increased the volume of the bullet outside the case, thus allowing more room inside the case, needed for large loads of slower burning powders (see internal ballistics). These bullets are popular for both target shooting and hunting. When shooting paper targets, they cut a relatively clean hole in the target, yet provide more case volume and a better ballistic coefficient than a flat front wadcutter. When used for hunting, the heavy bullets provide excellent penetration; they are often used on dangerous game, for which more reliable penetration is required than is possible with expanding hollow point or soft point bullets.

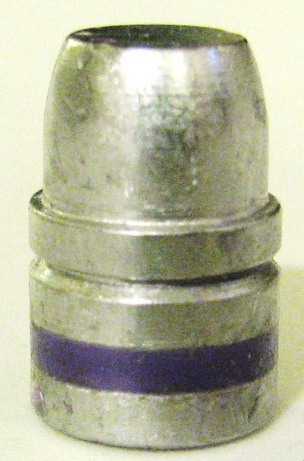
Keith-Style SWC

Originally Keith specified a meplat that was 65% of the bullet caliber, but later increased it to a 70% meplat. The other distinguishing characteristics of a "Keith-style" SWC are a double radius ogive, beveled crimp groove, three equal width driving bands, wide square bottomed grease groove, and a plain base with sharp corners. The wide forward driving band helps keep the bullet aligned as it jumps across the cylinder gap. Because of the three wide equal width driving bands, the total bearing surface is half the length of the bullet. The relatively large bearing surface helps the Keith-style SWC to be an inherently accurate bullet and minimizes pressure leakage due to projectile blow-by. The wide square bottom grease groove holds ample lubricant.

=== Work with rifles ===
Keith was instrumental in the development of various wildcat cartridges, a few of which were later adopted as factory rounds. The .333 OKH ("O'Neil-Keith-Hopkins"), developed in conjunction with Charlie O'Neil and Don Hopkins, was made from .30-06 Springfield brass necked up to take the .333" 250 and 300-grain bullets of the .333 Jeffery. There was also a .334 OKH, based on the shortened .300 H&H Magnum case. The .333 OKH, necked up slightly to take the more common .338" sized bullets of the older .33 Winchester, led to the creation of the popular Wildcat cartridge the .338-06, also known as the 338 OKH, and was the inspiration for the 1958 commercial introduction of the .338 Winchester Magnum based on the larger belted .458 Winchester Magnum case. The .334 OKH, likewise necked up to accept .338" bullets and given the distinctive Weatherby "double-radius" shoulder, was introduced by Weatherby in 1963 as the .340 Weatherby Magnum. The .338-378 Weatherby Magnum, introduced in 1998, was developed based on another one of Keith's wildcats, the .338–378 KT(Keith-Thomson), which he developed in the 1960s with Bob Thomson.

An admirer of the old British double rifles, Keith had numerous examples in his collection. He used two of these doubles, a .476 Westley Richards and a .500 Nitro Express, to take dangerous game in Africa on two different safaris. Keith documented the first of these hunts in his 1968 tome, Safari.

In 1935, Elmer Keith, along with four others, spent about a year and a half designing the Winchester Model 70 bolt-action rifle.

== Personal life ==
Keith's trademarks were his cigars, his Stetson, his love for revolvers, and his outspoken opinions. Keith was an avid handgun hunter in the earliest days of the sport, and often hunted medium game with a double action Smith & Wesson revolver. In the days when handgun cartridges tended to fire large, slow bullets like the popular .45 Colt, or light, fast bullets like the .30 Mauser, Keith was pushing the limits of existing cartridges, driving large bullets at higher velocities.

He was married to Loraine Randall. Elmer Keith was born near Hardin, Missouri, but was raised in Montana, Idaho, and eastern Oregon. In the 1930s and early 1940s, he had a ranch on the North Fork of the Salmon River near Salmon, Idaho. In the late 1940s, Elmer and Loraine left the ranch and moved into the town of Salmon. The ranch is still owned by the Keith family. He died in Boise, Idaho on February 14, 1984.

== Published works ==
Keith was a prolific writer, writing both books and magazine columns. During the 1950s and 1960s, he was especially well known for his regular monthly columns he wrote for Guns & Ammo magazine and American Rifleman, typically exploring the performance of the latest new gun offerings, especially those firing large, heavy bullets pushed to high velocities. He has influenced modern gun writers such as Mike Venturino and John Taffin.

- Sixgun Cartridges and Loads. Onslow County, N.C., Small Arms Technical Publishing Co, 1936.
- Big Game Rifles and Cartridges. Onslow County, N.C., Small Arms Technical Publishing Co, 1936.
- Keith's Rifles for Larger Game Huntington, WV: Standard Publications, 1946.
- Elmer Keith's Big Game Hunting. Boston: Little, Brown, 1948.
- Shotguns. Harrisburg, Pennsylvania: Stackpole & Heck, 1950.
- Sixguns. Harrisburg, Pennsylvania: Stackpole & Heck, 1955.
- Guns and Ammo for Hunting Big Game, with John Lachuk. Los Angeles, Calif. : Petersen Publishing Co.,1965.
- Safari. La Jolla, Calif: Safari Publications, 1968.
- Keith, An Autobiography, Winchester Press, 1974
- Hell, I Was There (autobiography). Los Angeles, Calif.: Petersen Publishing Co., 1979.

== In popular culture ==
In season one, episode eleven of Sledge Hammer!, "To Live and Die on TV", on the game show he is a contestant on, Sledge is asked: "Elmer Keith is known as the Father of what?", to which Sledge answers, "He invented the .44 Magnum!".

In The Phantom Of Phu Bai, a biography of USMC Scout Sniper Eric England written by Joseph B. Turner, one chapter is about Elmer Keith and his influence on the shooting community.

== See also ==
- List of famous big game hunters
