= List of .45 caliber handguns =

The .45 ACP (not to be confused with .45 Colt) cartridge is a very popular caliber due to its low velocity and relatively high stopping power. This caliber is associated most with the Colt M1911, logically, as ACP literally means 'Automatic Colt Pistol'. However, there are many more guns and variations on the M1911 that are chambered in .45 ACP. This list does not list all of them, just ones that have links to pages on Wikipedia, for further inquiry.

| Name | Manufacturer | Image | Cartridge | Country | Year |
|---|---|---|---|---|---|
| ALFA Defender | ALFA - PROJ spol. s r.o. | | 9×19mm Parabellum.40 S&W.45 ACP | Czech Republic | |
| ALFA Combat | ALFA - PROJ spol. s r.o. | | 9×19mm Parabellum.40 S&W.45 ACP | Czech Republic | |
| AMT Backup | Arcadia Machine & Tool; Galena Industries | | 9×19mm Parabellum.22 LR.357 SIG.38 Super.380 ACP.40 S&W.400 Corbon.45 ACP | United States | 1978 |
| AMT Hardballer | Arcadia Machine & Tool; Galena Industries | | 10mm Auto.40 S&W.400 Corbon.45 ACP | United States | 1977 |
| AMT Skipper | Arcadia Machine & Tool; Galena Industries | | 10mm Auto.40 S&W.45 ACP | United States | |
| Arminex Trifire | Arminex Ltd | | 9×19mm Parabellum.38 Super.45 ACP | United States | 1979 |
| Astra A-80 | Astra-Unceta y Cia SA | | 7.65×21mm Parabellum; 9×19mm Parabellum; 9×23mm Largo.38 Super.45 ACP | Spain | 1982 |
| Ballester–Molina | Hispano Argentina Fábrica de Automóviles S.A. | | .45 ACP.22 LR | Argentina | 1938 |
| Beretta 8000 | Beretta | | 9×19mm Parabellum.357 SIG.40 S&W.41 Action Express.45 ACP | Italy | 1994 |
| Beretta Px4 Storm | Beretta | | 9×19mm Parabellum.40 S&W.45 ACP | Italy | 2004 |
| BFD 1911 | BFD | | .45 ACP | United States | 2010s |
| Bren Ten | Dornaus & Dixon Enterprises, Inc. | | 10mm Auto.45 ACP.22 Long Rifle | United States | 1983 |
| CAC 45-1 | Mossberg | | .45 ACP | United States | 1979 |
| Colt Double Eagle | Colt Manufacturing Company | | .45 ACP; 10mm Auto.40 S&W; 9×19mm Parabellum.38 Super | United States | 1985 |
| Colt New Service | Colt Manufacturing Company | | .45 Colt.455 Webley.476 Enfield.45 ACP.44-40 Winchester.44 Special.38-40 Winchester.38 Special.357 Magnum | United States | 1898 |
| Colt Officer's ACP | Colt Manufacturing Company | | .45 ACP | United States | 1985 |
| Colt OHWS | Colt Manufacturing Company | | .45 ACP | United States | |
| Colt Single Action Army | Colt Manufacturing Company | | .45 ACP.45 Colt.44-40 Winchester.38-40 Winchester.32-20 Winchester.38 Long Colt.22 Long Rifle.38 Special.357 Magnum.44 Special | United States | 1872 |
| Continental Weapons Griffon | Continental Weapons | | .45 ACP | South Africa | |
| CZ 97B | Česká zbrojovka Uherský Brod | | .45 ACP | Czech Republic | 1997 |
| DOSS SH.A.R. Psh-45 | DOSS SH.A.R. | | .45 ACP | Ukraine | |
| FitzGerald Special | Colt USA | | .38 Special.45 ACP | United States | 1926 |
| FN FNP | FNH USA | | 9×19mm Parabellum.40 S&W.45 ACP.357 SIG | Belgium; United States | 2006 |
| FN FNX | FNH USA | | 9×19mm Parabellum.40 S&W.45 ACP | Belgium; United States | 2009 |
| FP-45 Liberator | General Motors Guide Lamp Division | | .45 ACP | United States | 1942 |
| Glock 21 | Glock Ges.m.b.H. | | .45 ACP | Austria | 1979 |
| Glock 30 | Glock Ges.m.b.H. | | .45 ACP | Austria | 1979 |
| Glock 36 | Glock Ges.m.b.H. | | .45 ACP | Austria | 1979 |
| Glock 41 | Glock Ges.m.b.H. | | .45 ACP | Austria | 1979 |
| Heckler & Koch HK45 | Heckler & Koch | | .45 ACP | Germany | 2006 |
| Heckler & Koch Mark 23 | Heckler & Koch | | .45 ACP | Germany | 1991 |
| Heckler & Koch USP | Heckler & Koch; Hellenic Defence Systems | | 9×19mm Parabellum.357 SIG.40 S&W.45 ACP | Germany | 1989 |
| Hi-Point Model JHP | Hi-Point Firearms | | .45 ACP | United States | |
| HS2000 | HS Produkt | | 9×19mm Parabellum.357 SIG.40 S&W.45 GAP.45 ACP | Croatia | 1999 |
| IWI Jericho 941 | Israel Weapons Industries | | 9×19mm Parabellum.40 S&W.41 Action Express.45 ACP | Israel | 1990 |
| Kahr P series | Kahr Arms | | .380 ACP; 9×19mm Parabellum.40 S&W.45 ACP | United States | 1999 |
| Kahr PM series | Kahr Arms | | 9×19mm Parabellum.40 S&W.45 ACP | United States | 2004 |
| Kimber Custom | Kimber Manufacturing | | .45 ACP | United States | 1997 |
| LaserAim 45 | LaserAim Arms | | .45 ACP | United States | 1990s |
| Lewis Automatic Pistol | | | .45 ACP | United States | 1919 |
| M15 pistol | Rock Island Arsenal | | .45 ACP | United States | 1972 |
| M1911 | Colt Manufacturing Company | | .45 ACP | United States | 1911 |
| M1917 Revolver | Colt Manufacturing Company; Smith & Wesson | | .45 ACP (11.43×23mm).45 Auto Rim | United States | 1917 |
| MAC-10 | Military Armament Corporation | | 9×19mm Parabellum.45 ACP (11.43x23mm) | United States | 1964 |
| Malinnov 1911 | Aegis Malinnov Sdn Bhd | | .45 ACP | Malaysia | 2010s |
| Metro Arms SPS | Metro Arms | | .45 ACP | Spain | |
| MEU(SOC) pistol | Rifle Team Equipment Shop; USMC Precision Weapons Shop | | .45 ACP | United States | 1986 |
| M.R. M1911 | M.R. New System Arms | | .45 ACP | United States | 2010s |
| Obregón pistol | National Army of Mexico | | .45 ACP | Mexico | Mid-1930s |
| ODI Viking Combat | Omega Defensive Industries | | 9x19mm Parabellum.38 Super.45 ACP | United States | 1981 |
| P10, P12, P14, LDA | Para-Ordnance AKA Para USA | | 9×19mm Parabellum.38 ACP.40 S&W.45 ACP | Canada | 1985 |
| Pardini GT45 | Pardini Arms | | 9×19mm Parabellum; 9×21mm.40 S&W.45 ACP | Italy | |
| Revol Arms DL45 | Revol Arms | | .45 ACP | United States | 2017 |
| RIA 1911 | Armscor (Philippines) | | .45 ACP; 10mm Auto.40 S&W.38 Super; 9mm Luger.22 TCM | Philippines | |
| Ruger P90 | Sturm, Ruger & Co. | | .45 ACP | United States | 1985 |
| Ruger P97 | Sturm, Ruger & Co. | | .45 ACP | United States | 1999 |
| Ruger SR45 | Sturm, Ruger & Co. | | .45 ACP | United States | 2007 |
| Ruger Redhawk | Sturm, Ruger & Co. | | .38 Special.357 Magnum.41 Magnum.44 Special.44 Magnum.45 Colt.45 ACP | United States | 1979 |
| Semmerling LM4 | Semmerling | | .45 ACP | United States | 1980s |
| Semmerling XLM | Semmerling | | .45 ACP | United States | 1980s |
| SIG Sauer P220 | SIG Sauer | | 7.65×21mm Parabellum; 9×19mm Parabellum; 9mm Steyr.38 Super; 10mm Auto.22 Long Rifle.45 ACP | Switzerland | 1975 |
| SIG Sauer P227 | SIG Sauer | | .45 ACP | Switzerland | 2013 |
| SIG Sauer P250 | SIG Sauer | | 9×19mm Parabellum.22 LR.357 SIG.380 ACP.40 S&W.45 ACP | United States | 2007 |
| SIG Sauer P320 | SIG Sauer | | 9×19mm Parabellum; 10mm Auto.357 SIG.40 S&W.45 ACP | United States | 2014 |
| Smith & Wesson Governor | Smith & Wesson | | .410 bore.45 ACP.45 Schofield.45 Colt.45 Auto Rim | United States | 2011 |
| Smith & Wesson M&P | Smith & Wesson | | FN 5.7×28mm 9×19mm Parabellum; 10mm Auto.22 LR.22 WMR.30 Super Carry.357 SIG.380 ACP.40 S&W.45 ACP | United States | 2005 |
| Smith & Wesson Model 22 | Smith & Wesson | | .45 ACP.45 Auto Rim.45 GAP | United States | 1917 |
| Smith & Wesson Model 25 | Smith & Wesson | | .45 ACP.45 Colt | United States | 1955 |
| Smith & Wesson Model 625 | Smith & Wesson | | .45 ACP.45 Auto Rim.45 Colt.45 GAP | United States | 1988 |
| Smith & Wesson Model 645 | Smith & Wesson | | .45 ACP | United States | 1985 |
| Smith & Wesson Model 745 | Smith & Wesson | | .45 ACP | United States | 1985 |
| Smith & Wesson 4506 | Smith & Wesson | | .45 ACP | United States | 1988 |
| Sokolovsky Automaster | Sokolovsky Corp. | | .45 ACP | United States | 1977 |
| Stahl Mod. SLP 03 | Peters Stahl | | .45 ACP | Germany | 19?? |
| Star Megastar | Star Bonifacio Echeverria, S.A. | | 10mm Auto.45 ACP | Spain | 1993 |
| Star Model PD | Star Bonifacio Echeverria, S.A. | | .45 ACP | Spain | 1975 |
| Taurus Judge | Taurus (manufacturer) | | .410 bore.454 Casull.45 ACP.45 Schofield | Brazil | 2006 |
| Taurus Millennium series | Taurus (manufacturer) | | 9×19mm Parabellum.40 S&W.32 ACP.45 ACP.380 ACP | Brazil | 2005 |
| Taurus PT24/7 | Taurus (manufacturer) | | 9×19mm Parabellum.40 S&W.45 ACP | Brazil | 2004 |
| Taurus PT1911 | Taurus (manufacturer) | | 9×19mm Parabellum.45 ACP | Brazil | 2005 |
| Walther PPQ | Carl Walther GmbH | | 9×19mm Parabellum; 9×21mm.40 S&W.45 ACP | Germany | 2011 |
| Zastava PPZ | Zastava Arms | | 7.62×25mm Tokarev; 9×19mm Parabellum.40 S&W.45 ACP | Serbia | 2007 |
