= MIL Thunder 5 =

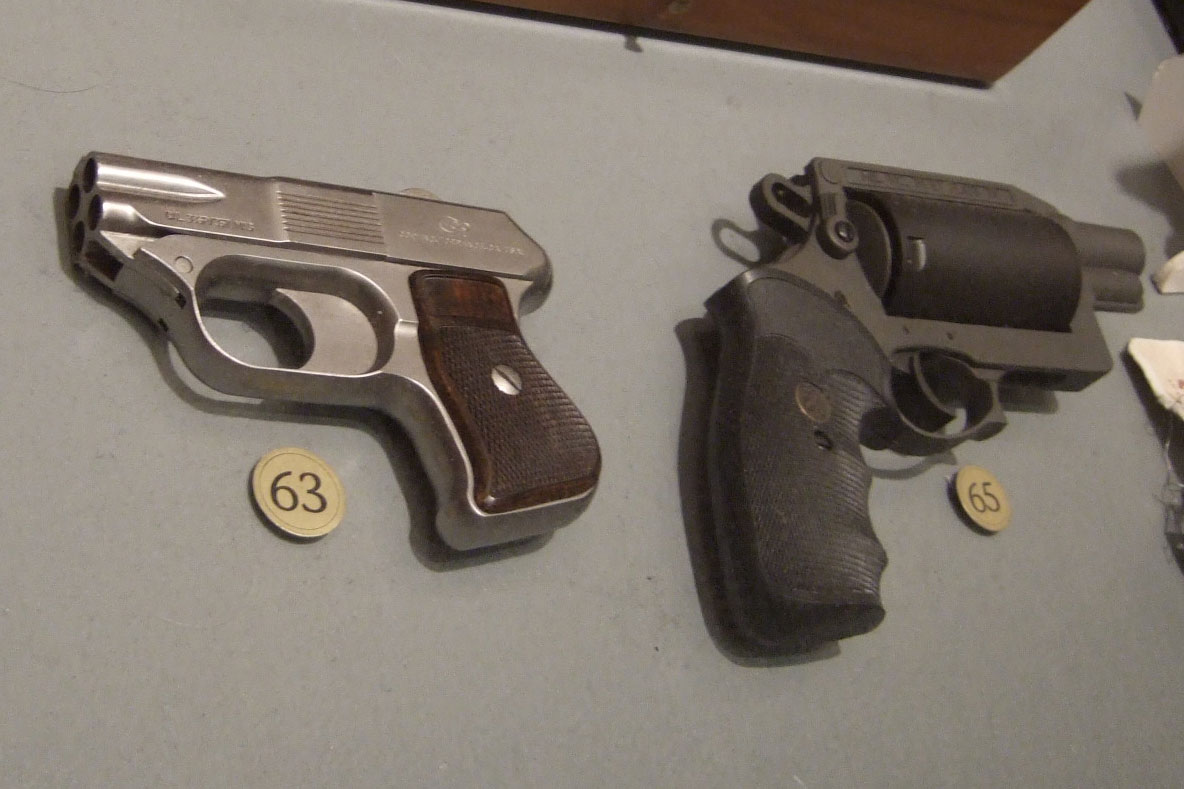
- A Thunder 5 (right) next to a COP 357 Derringer
- Type: Revolver
- Place of origin: United States

Production history
- Manufacturer: MIL, Inc. (Munitions International Laboratory, Inc.)
- Produced: 1992–1998
- Variants: California-approved model

Specifications
- Mass: 48 ounces (1.4 kg)
- Length: 9 inches (228.6 mm)
- Barrel length: 2 inches (50.8 mm)
- Cartridge: .410 bore; .45 Colt; .45-70 Government (California-approved model)
- Action: Double-action
- Feed system: 5-round cylinder
- Sights: Fixed sights

The MIL, Inc. Thunder 5 is a double-action revolver chambered to fire both the .410-bore shotshell cartridge and the .45 Colt revolver cartridge.

== Description ==
The Thunder 5 is a large double-action revolver, chambered for the 3-inch (76 mm) .410 shotshells and .45 Colt cartridges. As the barrel is rifled, the Thunder 5 is not considered a short-barrelled shotgun under United States federal law, but is restricted under California statutes. In 1994, a variant was produced in .45-70 Government, to make it legal in the state of California.

It was fitted with Pachmayr decelerator grips and was available in either matte or bright stainless steel finish with fixed sights. Unusual for a double-action revolver, the Thunder 5 features a manual safety lever. Sub-caliber sleeve inserts in 9mm Parabellum, .38 Special/.357 Magnum, and .38 Super cartridges were available until 1998.

It did appear in a few contemporary movies such as RoboCop 3 (1993), Black Dog (1998), Three Kings (1999), and Crank: High Voltage (2009); but otherwise generated little interest and was discontinued in 1999. After it was discontinued, the Thunder 5 became a collector's item. In recent years the concept of the .410/.45 hybrid revolver has been revived by Taurus and Smith & Wesson.

== See also ==
- Bond Arms Derringer
- MAG-7
- Smith & Wesson Governor
- Taurus Judge
