= Taurus Judge =

Taurus Raging Judge
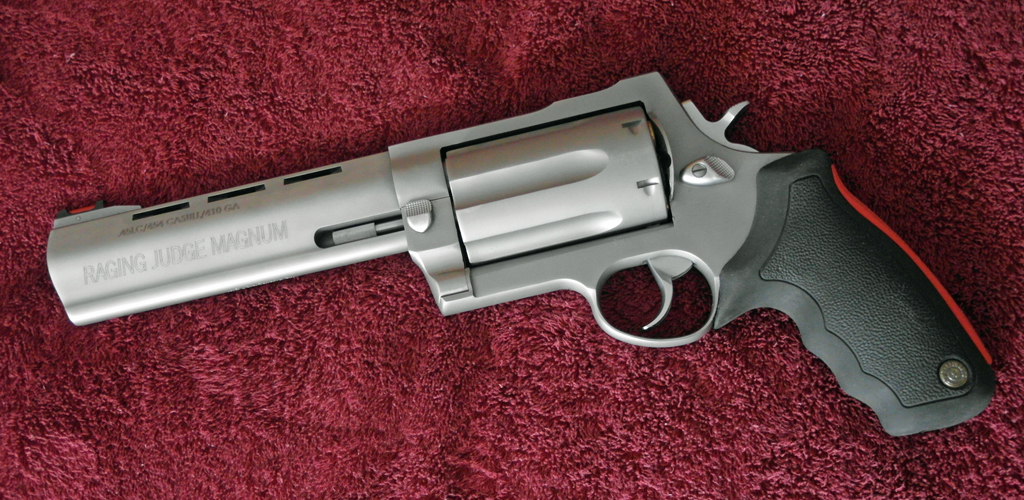
- Taurus "Raging Judge Magnum" revolver with 6.5 inch barrel, chambered in .454 Casull, .45 Colt, and .410 bore shotshell. All Judge revolvers can also fire the short .45 Schofield (.45 S&W).
- Type: Revolver
- Place of origin: Brazil

Production history
- Manufacturer: Taurus International
- Produced: 2006–present
- Variants: 4410, 4510, 513

Specifications
- Mass: 29 oz (820 g)
- Length: 7.5 in (190 mm)
- Barrel length: 3 in (76 mm)
- Width: 1.531 in (38.9 mm)
- Height: 5.394 in (137.0 mm)
- Caliber: .410 bore.454 Casull (Raging Judge only).45 Colt.45 Schofield
- Action: Double-action revolver
- Feed system: 5, 6, or 7 round cylinder
- Sights: Fixed

The Taurus Raging Judge is a five-shot revolver designed and produced by Taurus International, chambered for .410 bore shot shells and the .45 Colt cartridge. Taurus promotes the Judge as a self-defense tool against carjacking and for home protection.

== History ==
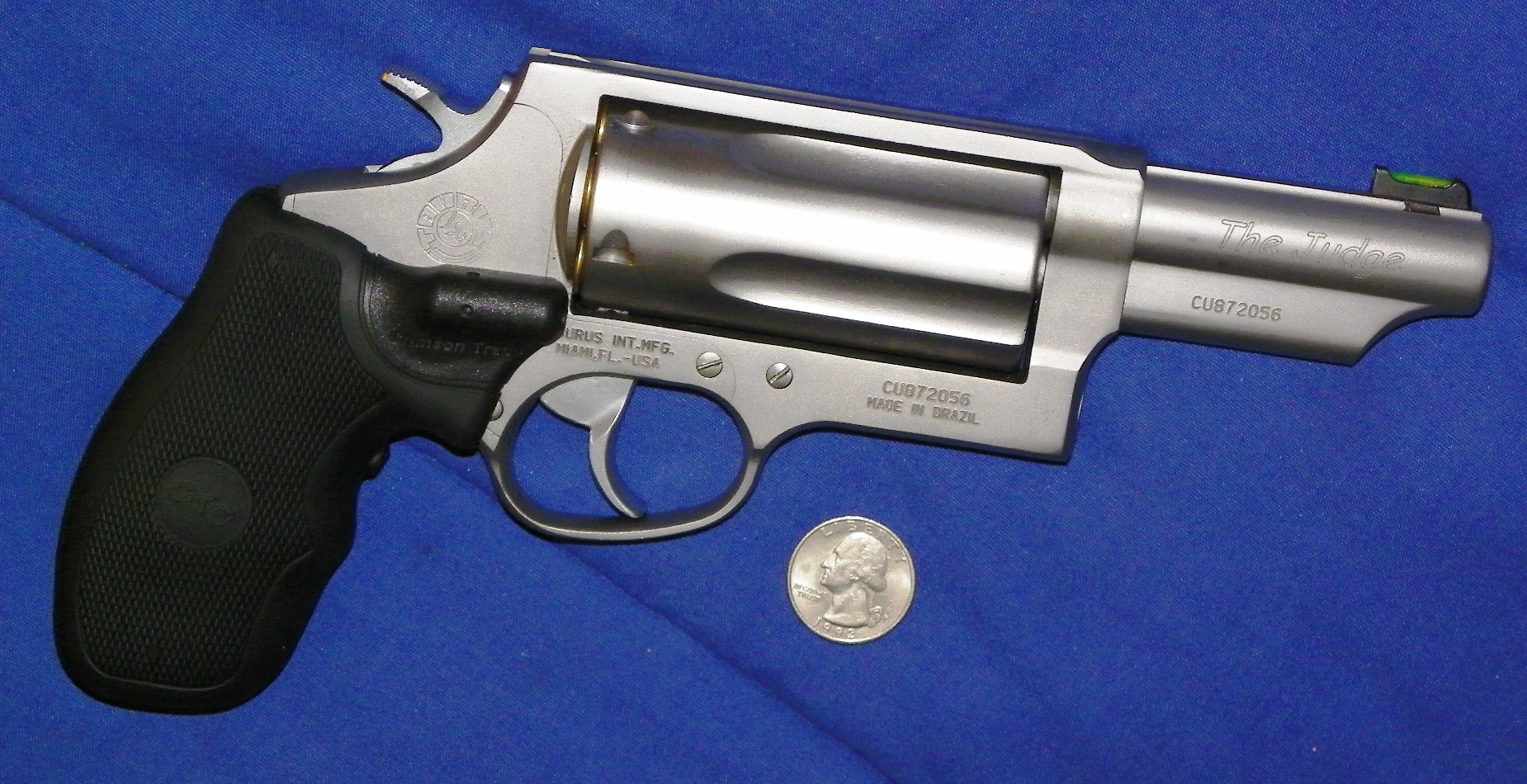
Taurus Judge 'Magnum' edition, shown to scale with a US quarter (diameter 24 mm/0.95 in)

There have been two model number designations for this firearm, the 4410 (no longer produced) and the 4510 (current). Both model numbers are essentially the same revolver, and any 4410 or 4510 will yield basically the same performance. It got its name "The Judge" in 2006 when Bob Morrison, Executive Vice President, learned that judges in high-crime areas of Miami, Florida, were purchasing the revolver for personal defense in their courtrooms, and after Morrison investigated further, the model designation was changed from 4410 to 4510 to more accurately reflect the revolver's versatility (.45 Colt + 410 shot → "4510"). In 2009 Taurus International reported that the Judge was their top-selling firearm.

The rifling is shallower than normal, giving single-projectile loads less stabilization than they would receive in other handguns while reducing the rapid dispersion of the shot from shotshells. Taurus developed the shallow rifling after numerous experiments to find rifling that worked well with both types of ammunition.

Though Taurus deliberately designed the Judge to fire shotshells, the Judge does not qualify as a "short-barreled shotgun" under the National Firearms Act of 1934 as its rifled barrel makes it a regular handgun. However, the Judge is considered a short-barreled shotgun under California state law, which has a broader definition of "short-barreled shotgun," and the Judge is thus illegal to ship to, or purchase in that state.

== Models ==
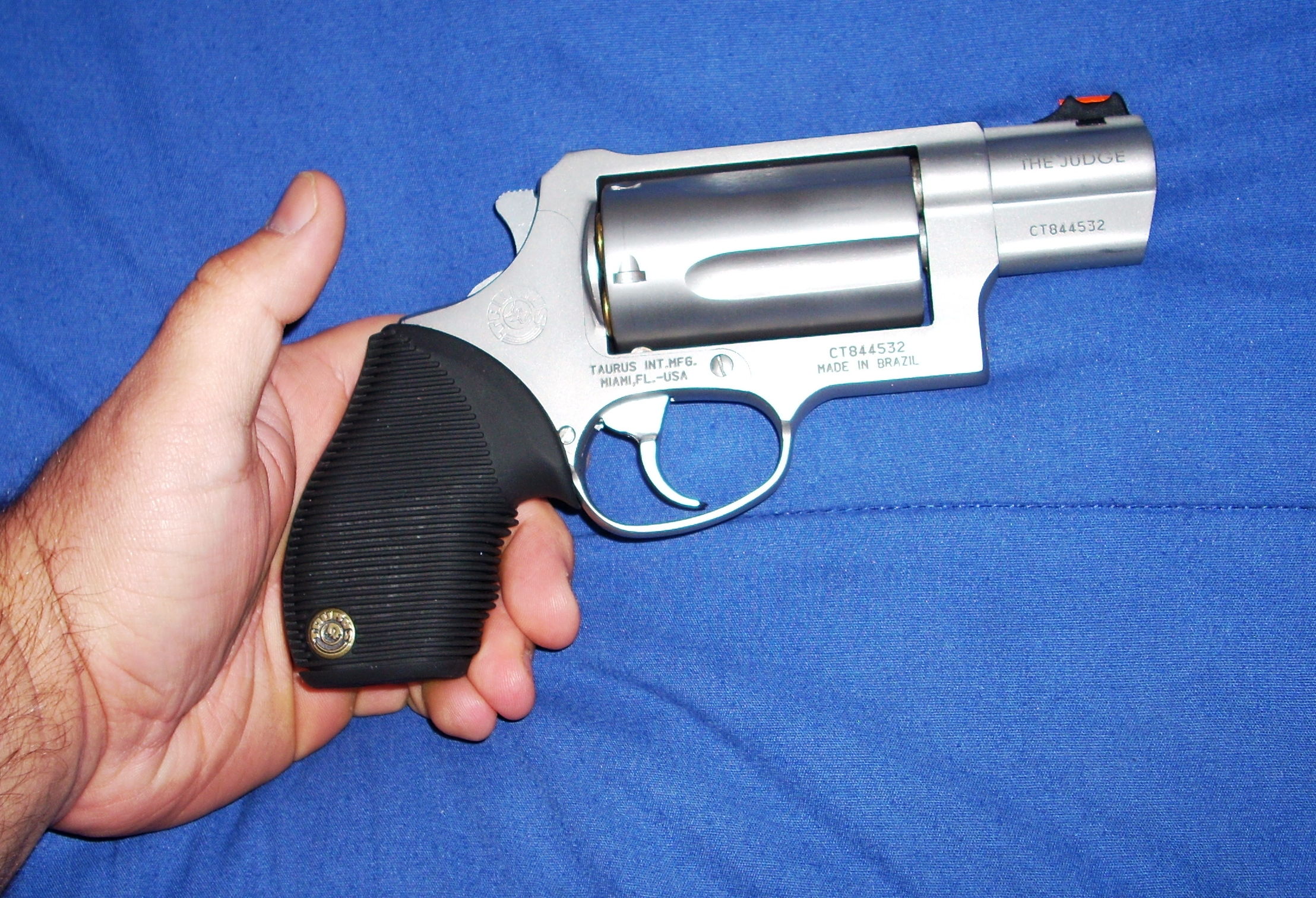
Taurus Public Defender revolver, detailing the shortened hammer and snub-nose barrel

The Judge, a derivative of the Taurus Tracker, comes in three barrel lengths (3", 4" and 6.5" - Tracker), two cylinder lengths (2.5" and 3"), and two finishes (blued and stainless steel). The 3" barrel model also comes in two weight classes, the standard steel construction (29 oz. currently, 36 oz. previously) and alloy-based "Ultra-Lite" (22 oz currently, 24 oz previously). Felt recoil can be significant with the Ultra-Lite series, due to its light weight, especially with .45 Colt rounds. As of December 2008, spur-less hammers remain available with all short-barrel lengths of The Judge.

At the Shooting, Hunting, Outdoor Trade Show in January 2009, Taurus introduced several new models of the Judge. These have been labeled the Public Defender series and are based on the Taurus Model 85 frame. As with the original Judge, these shoot five rounds of either .45 Colt or .410 shot. Taurus is positioning the Public Defender series as a concealed carry piece. Taurus also introduced the tactical R Ported. The Taurus 4510TKR-3SSR (stainless steel) and 4510TKR-3BR (blued) offer a 3″ ported barrel with a Picatinny rail.

In 2010 Taurus introduced the Raging Judge which is chambered for .454 Casull as well .45 Colt and 3" .410 shot shells.

In 2011 at SHOT Show in Las Vegas, Nevada, Taurus introduced the Raging Judge XXVIII chambered for 28 gauge shotshells. The 67-ounce revolver held five shells in the cylinder and had a 6.5" barrel. The cylinder used a double lock-up similar to the Raging Judge chambered in .454 Casull.

However, rumors began to quickly circulate during the show that the US' Bureau of Alcohol, Tobacco, Firearms and Explosives (ATF) seized the prototype guns due to an initial finding that the guns were actually short-barreled shotguns, and therefore illegal. However, American Rifleman reported that Taurus invited the ATF to a meeting to discuss the revolver, and no ATF determination was made at that time.

On March 27, 2011, Taurus International President and CEO Bob Morrison stated on the Gun Talk radio show that the Taurus Raging Judge XXVIII was still under development. Ultimately, the firearm never made it into production and no official statement was made by Taurus about it again.

=== Carbine ===
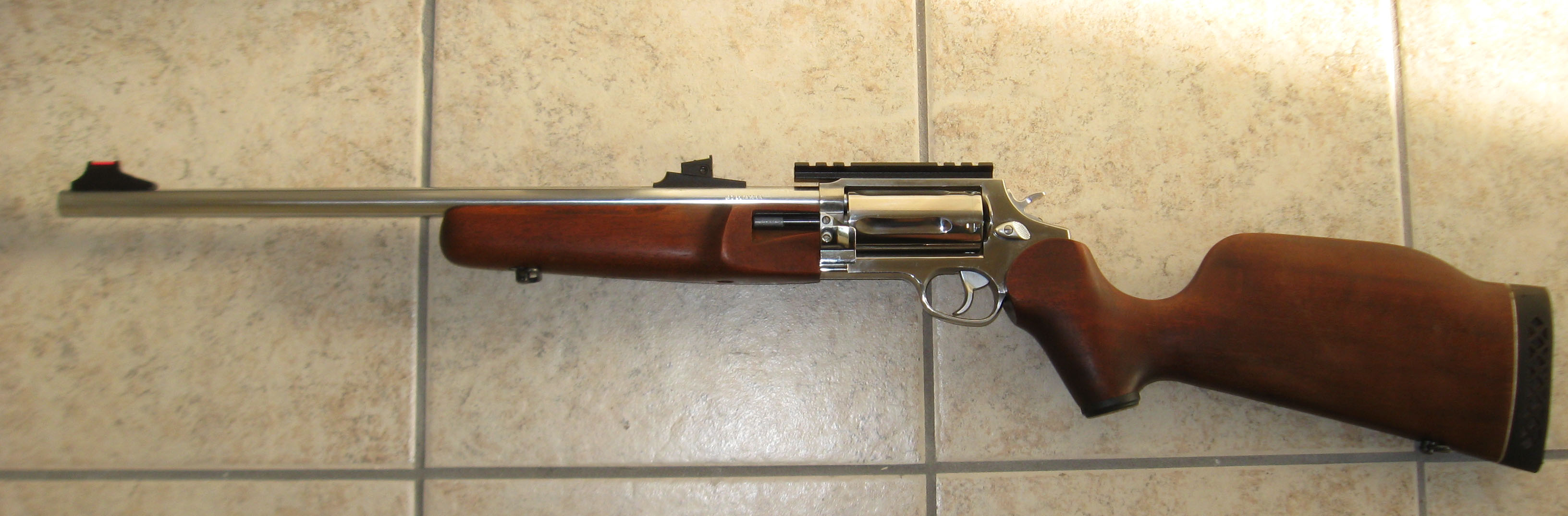
Circuit Judge carbine

Taurus makes an 18.5in barrelled carbine variant of the Taurus Judge revolver along with its partner company, Rossi. The carbine is known as the Taurus/Rossi Circuit Judge, or the Jury.

It comes in the original combination chambering of .410 bore and .45 Colt. The Taurus/Rossi Circuit Judge has small blast shields attached to the cylinder to protect the shooter from hot gases escaping between the cylinder and barrel.

The carbine has a buttstock and forend made of either Brazilian hardwood or plastic and uses a fiber optic front sight. An optional Picatinny scope mount base allows the user to mount a sight on the top of the frame and a choke is included for turkey hunting.

== Efficacy ==
Shotshells for use in handguns have long been made by loading handgun cartridges with shot rather than single bullets; they are commonly called "snake shot" or "rat shot", indicating their main use for pest control. However, shot is usually intended to be fired through a smooth bore, and the spin imparted by a handgun's rifling scatters it quite widely, limiting its effectiveness to very short ranges. To meet this market, Taurus designed the .45 Colt/.410 Judge to use both bulleted cartridges and .410 shotshells. The shallower rifling of the Judge's barrel is designed to stabilize bullets but not unduly scatter shot.

Taurus also paid attention to effectiveness with buckshot. One example would be 2-1/2" 4 pellet 000 buckshot, such as those offered by Federal and Remington, among others. In the original Judge chambering for standard 2 1/2" .410 shells, each shell contains three 000 buckshot, compared to nine 00 (.33") or eight 000 (.36") buckshot in the standard 12 gauge shell commonly used for personal defense or big game hunting. In 2008 Taurus introduced the Judge Magnum which can fire either standard 2 1/2" or 3" .410 shotshells which contain five 000 buckshot and are more effective as personal defense rounds. Several ammunition companies offer .410 ammo specifically designed for the Judge with propellant optimized for shorter barrels. The Federal 2 1/2" 000 buckshot shell contains 4 pellets. The Remington Home Defense 2.5" / 64mm 000 buckshot shell also contains 4 pellets. A cylinder full (6 shells) of 3" .410 shot shells is the approximate equivalent of three blasts (30; 000 buck pellets) from a 12 gauge shotgun loaded with 000 buck (9; 000 buck pellets each for a total of 27 pellets).

The Taurus Judge is based on the Taurus .45 Colt revolver and is adequate for its designed rounds. It was not designed for higher pressures generated by cartridges such as .44 Magnum or .454 Casull; to prevent the use of such rounds, the firing chambers of the Judge cylinder are choked to prevent chambering rounds larger in diameter than .410 shotshells and longer than .45 Colt cartridges. Later, Taurus introduced the Raging Judge Magnum based on their Raging Bull model designed for magnum cartridges; the Raging Judge Magnum safely chambers .454 Casull as well as .45 Colt cartridges.

== Gallery ==
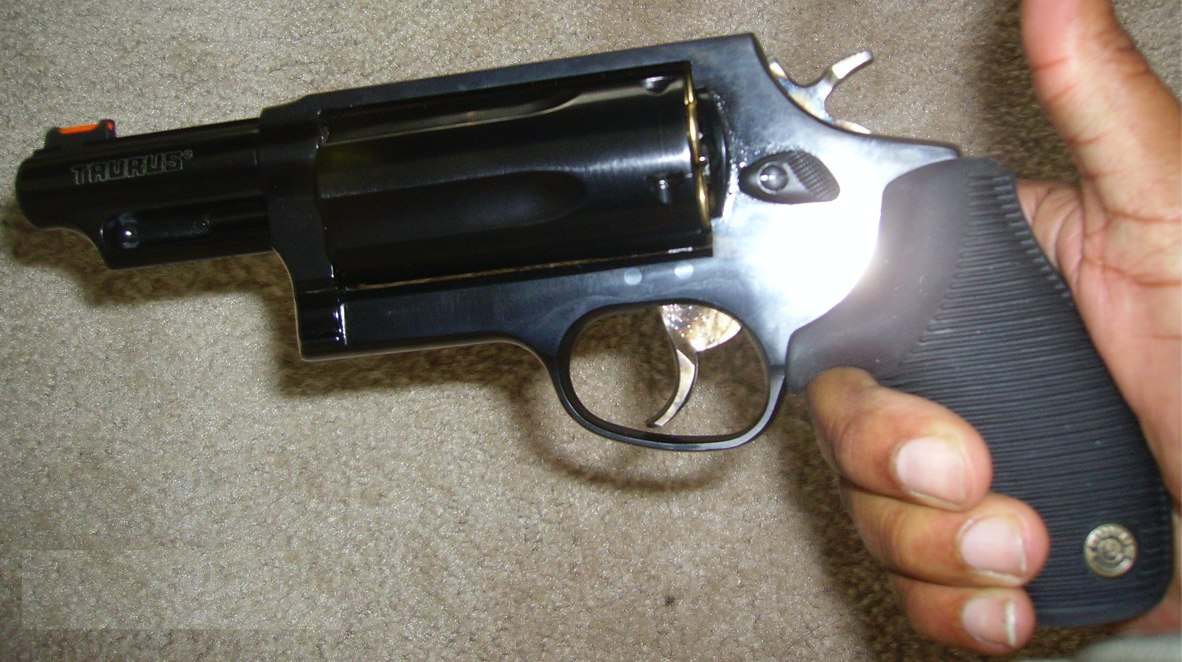
Original version of the Taurus Judge (blued finish)

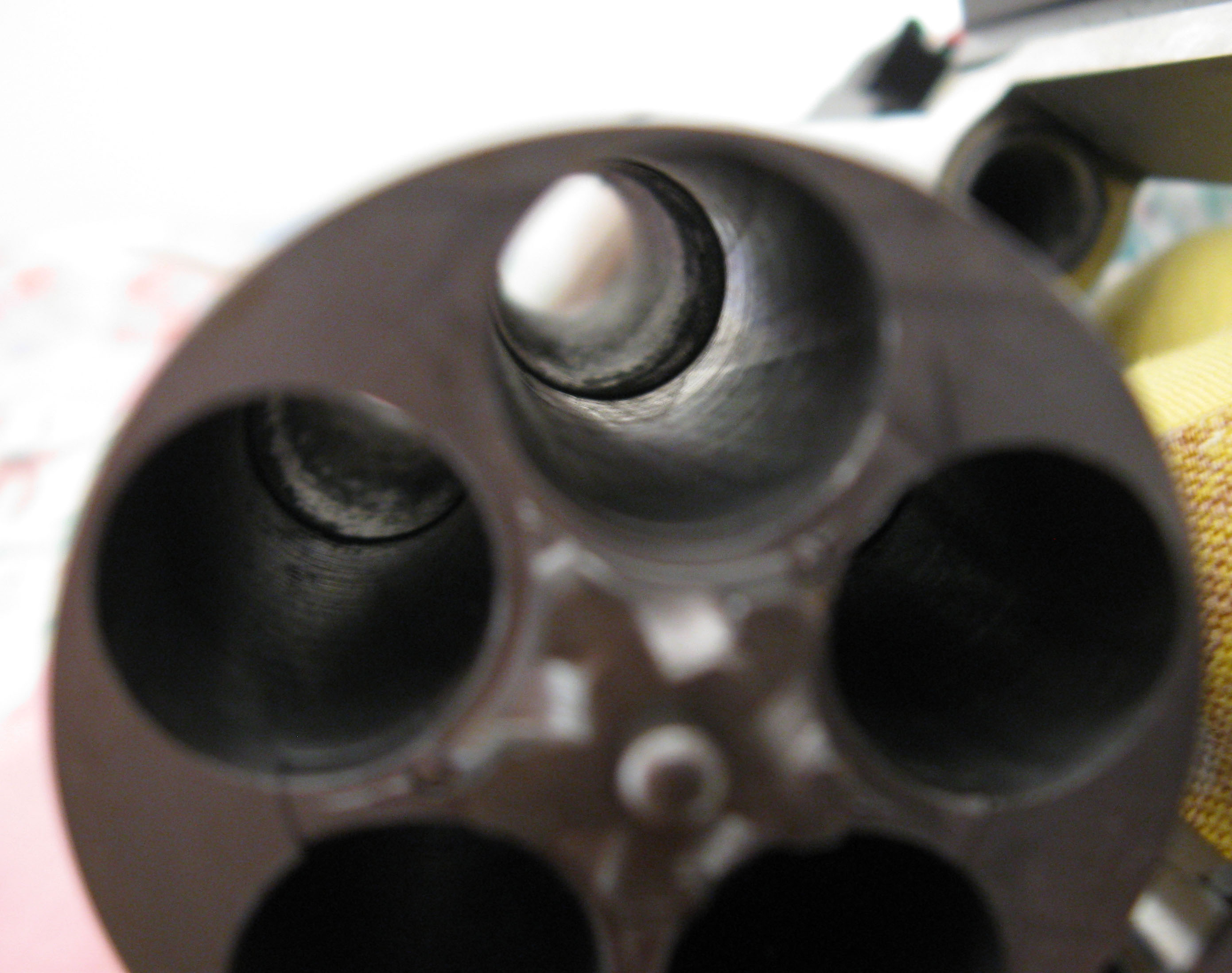
Closeup of the cylinder (carbine model pictured), showing the choked chambers that prevent loading .454 Casull rounds into non-magnum models

== See also ==
- MIL Thunder 5 - US designed and made shot pistol which predated the Judge
- Smith & Wesson Governor - a similar weapon sold by S&W as a response to the success of the Judge
- Bond Arms Derringer
- Kit gun
- .410 bore
- MAG-7
