= Smith & Wesson Governor =

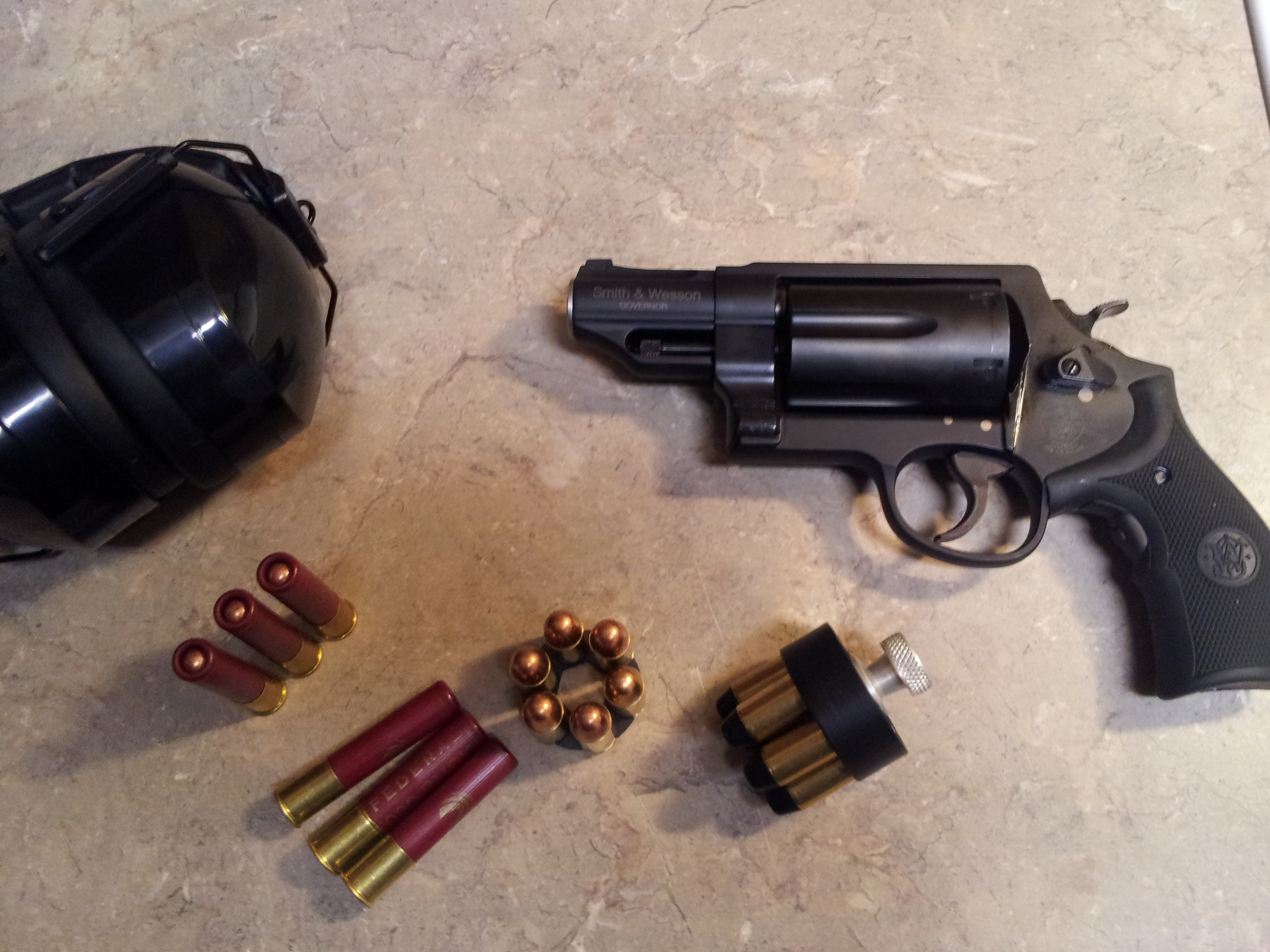
- Smith & Wesson Governor, with a speedloader, loaded with .45 Colt, a moon clip loaded with .45 ACP, and six Federal 2 1/2-inch "000" buckshot .410 shotgun shells, as well as hearing protection.
- Type: Revolver
- Place of origin: United States

Production history
- Manufacturer: Smith & Wesson
- Unit cost: $869–1,119 MSRP
- Produced: 2011–present

Specifications
- Mass: 29.6 oz (840 g)
- Length: 8.5 in (22 cm)
- Barrel length: 2.75 in (7.0 cm)
- Width: 1.75 in (4.4 cm)
- Height: 5.5 in (14 cm)
- Cartridge: .410 bore.45 ACP.45 Schofield.45 Colt
- Barrels: 2.75"/6.985 cm
- Action: Single or double action
- Feed system: 6-round cylinder
- Sights: Rear notch and tritium front blade

The Smith & Wesson Governor is a snub-nosed (2.75 inch barrel) single-action/double-action revolver built on the Z-frame (a stretched N-frame) and utilizes a K-frame grip with a lightweight scandium alloy or stainless steel frame.

== Design ==
Similar to the Taurus Judge, the Governor can fire 2 1/2-inch-long (64 mm) .410 shotgun shells, .45 Colt cartridges, and also .45 ACP cartridges with the use of supplied moon clips (due to the lack of a rim on the ACP cartridges).

The rear sights are fixed; similar to those found on the small J-Framed .38 Special and .357 Magnum as well as the medium-sized K-frame service revolvers. The front sights on both the standard and Crimson Trace models feature a tritium night sight that is drift-adjustable for windage corrections. It holds six rounds in any combination.

For a large handgun, the Governor is very lightweight—less than 30 ounces (850 g) unloaded—due to the alloys used in its construction.

== Models ==
Two versions of the alloy model are manufactured, the "iron sight" alloy Governor and the alloy model with the Crimson Trace laser sight.

There is a stainless steel version with open iron sights.

== See also ==
- Bond Arms Derringer
- MIL Thunder 5
- Taurus Judge
