= .410 bore =

Shotgun bore designed by Charles Eley and William Eley

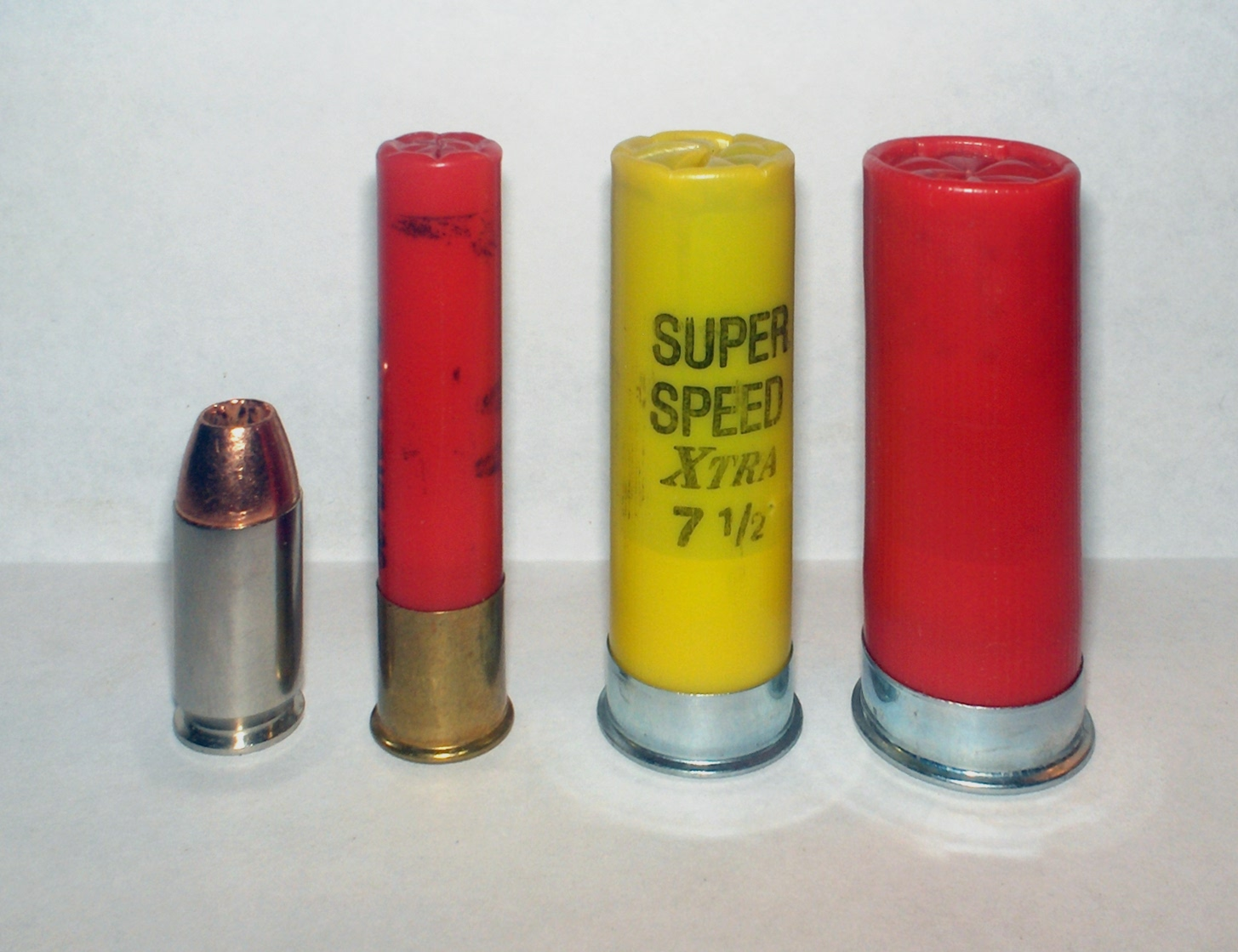
- From left to right: a .45 ACP, a .410 bore shotshell, a 20 gauge shotshell, and a 12 gauge shotshell
- Type: Shotgun, revolver, derringer
- Place of origin: United Kingdom

Production history
- Manufacturer: Eley Brothers
- Produced: 1874–present

Specifications
- Case type: Rimmed, straight
- Bullet diameter: .410 in (10.4 mm)
- Neck diameter: .455 in (11.6 mm)
- Base diameter: .470 in (11.9 mm)
- Rim diameter: .535 in (13.6 mm)
- Rim thickness: .060 in (1.5 mm)
- Overall length: 2 in (51 mm); 2 1/2 in (64 mm); 3 in (76 mm)
- Primer type: Shotshell primer
- Maximum pressure (SAAMI): 12,500 psi (86 MPa) (for 2 1/2 in (64 mm) length shells)
- Maximum pressure (SAAMI): 13,500 psi (93 MPa) (for 3 in (76 mm) length shells)

Ballistic performance
Bullet mass/type	Velocity	Energy
109.375 gr (7 g) Federal 2 1/2 in 1/4 oz. slug	1,780 ft/s (540 m/s)	769 ft⋅lbf (1,043 J)
109.375 gr (7 g) Winchester 3 in 1/4 oz. slug	1,800 ft/s (550 m/s)	787 ft⋅lbf (1,067 J)
350 gr (23 g) 3 in Winchester No. 000 buckshot (5 pellets)	1300 ft/s (396.24 m/s)	1,313 ft⋅lbf (1,780 J)
328.125 gr (21 g) Winchester 3 in 3/4 oz. No. 6 shot	1100 ft/s (335.28 m/s)	882 ft⋅lbf (1,196 J)
218.75 gr (14 g) Remington 2 1/2 in 1/2 oz. No. 7 1/2 shot	1,200 ft/s (370 m/s)	699 ft⋅lbf (948 J)

The .410 bore (10.4 mm) is a small caliber shotgun, firing one of the smallest commonly available shotgun shells. A .410 bore shotgun loaded with shot shells is well suited for small game hunting and pest control. The .410 started off in the United Kingdom as a garden gun along with the .360 and the No. 3 bore (9 mm) rimfire, No. 2 bore (7 mm) rimfire, and No. 1 bore (6 mm) rimfire. .410 shells have similar base dimensions to the .45 Colt cartridge, allowing many single-shot firearms, as well as derringers and revolvers chambered in that caliber, to fire .410 shot shells without any modifications.

Other small bore shotgun loads include the 9mm Flobert rimfire cartridge, and the less prevalent .22 rimfire shot shell.

== Origin ==
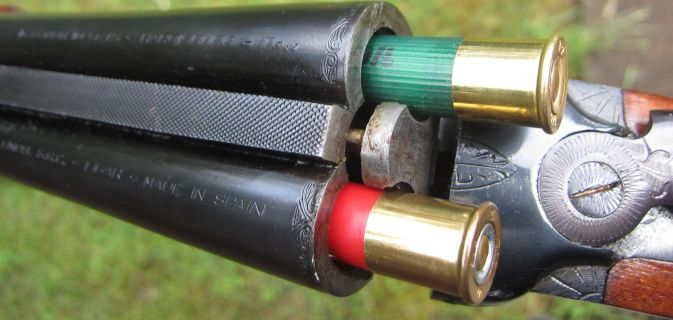
Two .410 shells being loaded into a side-by-side double-barrel shotgun

Lancaster's pattern centerfire and pinfire .410 shot cartridges first appeared in Eley Brothers Ltd. flysheets in 1857. By 1874, Eley was advertising modern centerfire .410 cartridges. It appears to have become popular around 1900, although it was recommended as "suited to the requirements of naturalists, garden guns and for such weapons as walking-stick guns", presumably for self-defense, in 1892 by W. W. Greener. The first ammunition was 2.0 inches (50.8 mm) long, compared with the modern 2.5 (63.5 mm) and 3.0-inch (76 mm) sizes. Aluminum shells are available but are not reloadable, as are paper or plastic shells. Full length brass shells can be found and are reloadable. Brass shells can be made from .444 Marlin rifle cartridges, and these are reloadable.

A .410 shotgun loaded with shot shells is well suited for small game hunting and pest control. Such game or pests include rabbits, squirrels, snakes, rats, and birds. Loaded with 1/4 ounce slugs, a .410 is effective against larger animals such as coyotes and deer.

As a defensive weapon, the .410 is inferior to the more common 12-gauge shotshell. However, a number of companies market defensive guns chambered in .410, such as the Mossberg 500 Home Security Model shotgun, the Smith & Wesson Governor revolver, and the Taurus Judge revolver. Defensive ammunition such as buckshot, slugs and combination loads are common. American Derringer and Winchester market ammunition loaded with five 000 buckshot pellets in 3-inch (76 mm) shells and three pellets in 2.5-inch (64 mm) shells. Combination shells such as Winchester Supreme Elite .410 shells are loaded with three 71 grain disks and twelve BB pellets.

== Survival arms ==
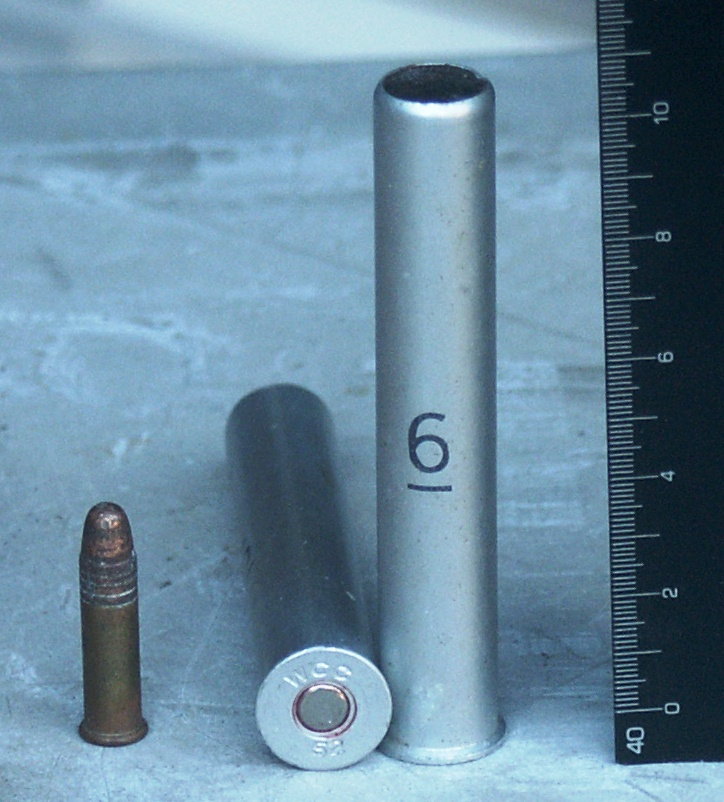
.410-bore M-35 shotgun shells for M6 survival rifle with .22 long rifle for comparison

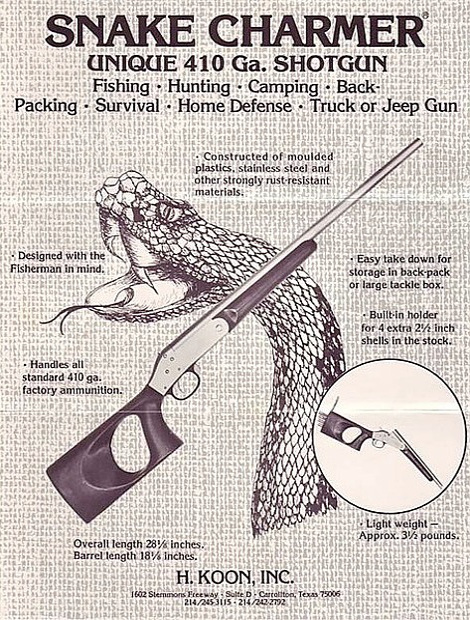
H. Koon "Snake Charmer" advertisement

The small size of the .410 bore makes it popular for use in compact firearms carried for emergency use, and it is often found in over-and-under combination guns, with a .22 Hornet or .22 rimfire rifle barrel mounted above and a .410 bore shotgun barrel mounted below.

The Snake Charmer is a .410 bore, stainless-steel, single-shot, break-action shotgun with an exposed hammer, an 18 1/8-inch (460 mm) barrel, black molded plastic furniture, and a short thumb-hole buttstock that holds four additional 2 1/2-inch (64 mm) shotgun shells. These light-weight 3 1/2-pound (1.6 kg) guns have an overall length of 28 1/8 inches (710 mm). They are commonly used by gardeners and farmers for pest control. It originally sold for $89.95 and was marketed as a general-purpose utility shotgun "perfect" for "fishing — hunting — camping — back packing — survival — home defense — truck or Jeep gun".

The Savage Model 24 is an American-made, over-and-under, combination gun, manufactured by Savage Arms. The basic .22LR over .410 bore model weighs 7 pounds (3.2 kg), has 24-inch (610 mm) barrels, and an overall length of 41 inches (1,000 mm). It may also be disassembled for ease of stowage. Its predecessor was made by Stevens and sported a tenite stock and forearm. In WWII, 15,000 were ordered and issued in air crew survival kits for Army Air Force bomber crews to be used as survival arms in the event that they were shot down.

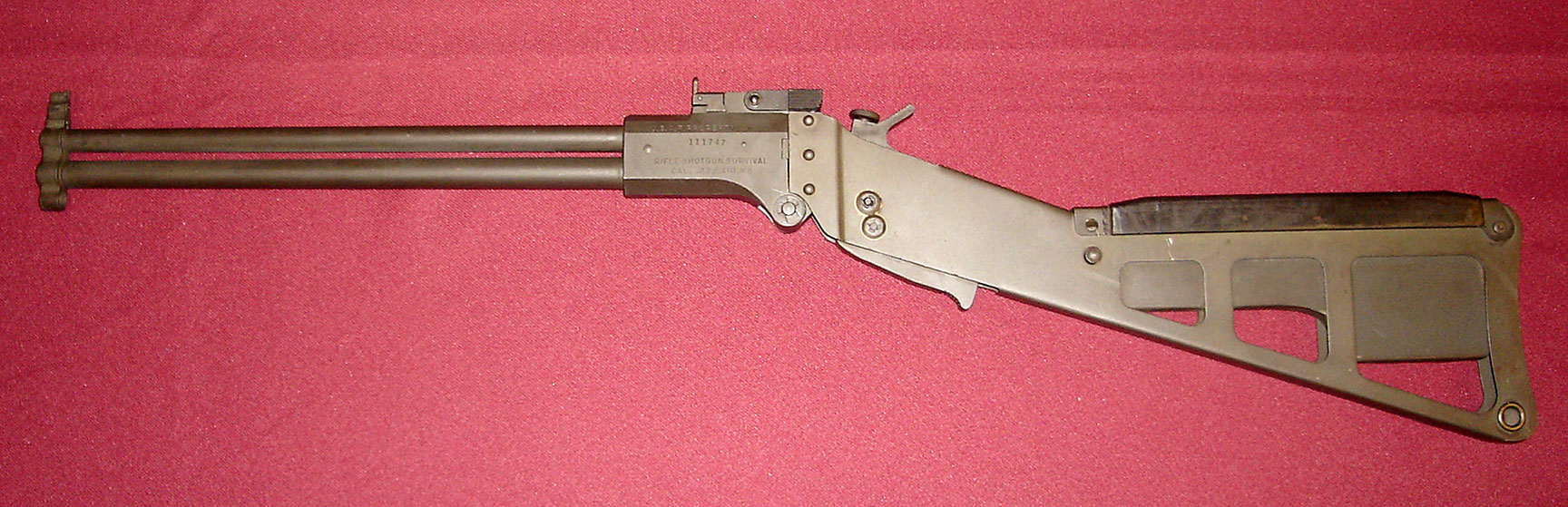
Original USAF M6 survival rifle/shotgun, caliber .22 Hornet/.410 shotgun

The M6 aircrew survival weapon was made for the US Air Force, with a .22 Hornet rifle barrel mounted over a .410 bore shotgun barrel and was first issued in the Korean War. The military also lists an aluminum .410 3-inch (76 mm) shell, with a rifle primer, as standard issue under the ammunition inventory name M-35. The civilian version Springfield Armory M6 Scout has a .22 rimfire or .22 Hornet over a .410 bore shotgun barrel. The original M6 has a 14-inch (360 mm) barrel, the same length as the stock, and folds in half for storage, making a compact package. With the short barrel, this is legally classified as an any other weapon in the United States, so the M6 Scout is made with 18.5-inch (470 mm) barrels for civilian sales. Special flare cartridges in .410 were issued with the USAF model.

== Handguns and shot pistols ==
The fact that the .410 bore shell fits in a .45 Colt chamber has resulted in some unusual applications. While shotguns are often limited in minimum length, a firearm chambered in .45 Colt, such as the Contender pistol, is not defined as a shotgun even though it can chamber shotgun shells. In the UK, .410 shot-pistols are used around pheasant pens to kill rats where a full-length shotgun would be inappropriate.

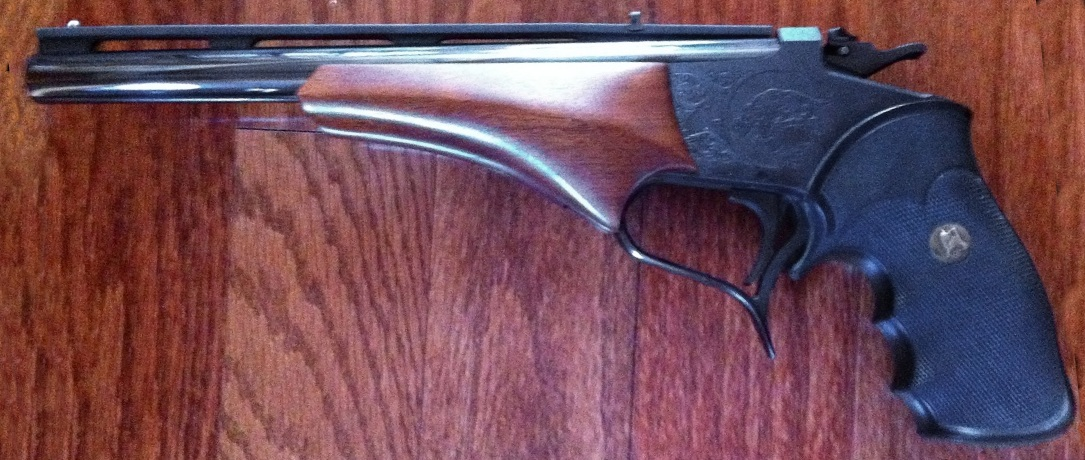
Contender in .45 Colt/.410 with ventilated rib

The Thompson Center Arms Contender pistols are commonly encountered with a special .45 Colt/.410 bore barrel. The barrel is rifled for the .45 Colt but has a special choke and vent rib to make it function as a shotgun. Due to the rifled barrel, the assembled firearm is considered a rifle or pistol (depending on barrel length) and thus is not subject to the United States' National Firearms Act's 18-inch (460 mm) minimum barrel length. Nonetheless, possession of a Thompson Center Arms .45/.410 pistol barrel is illegal in California, for both dealers and individuals, and such a barrel may not legally be shipped into the state, or even taken into California for a hunting trip, by reason of it being classified as a short barreled shotgun (SBSG) when used with a Contender receiver.

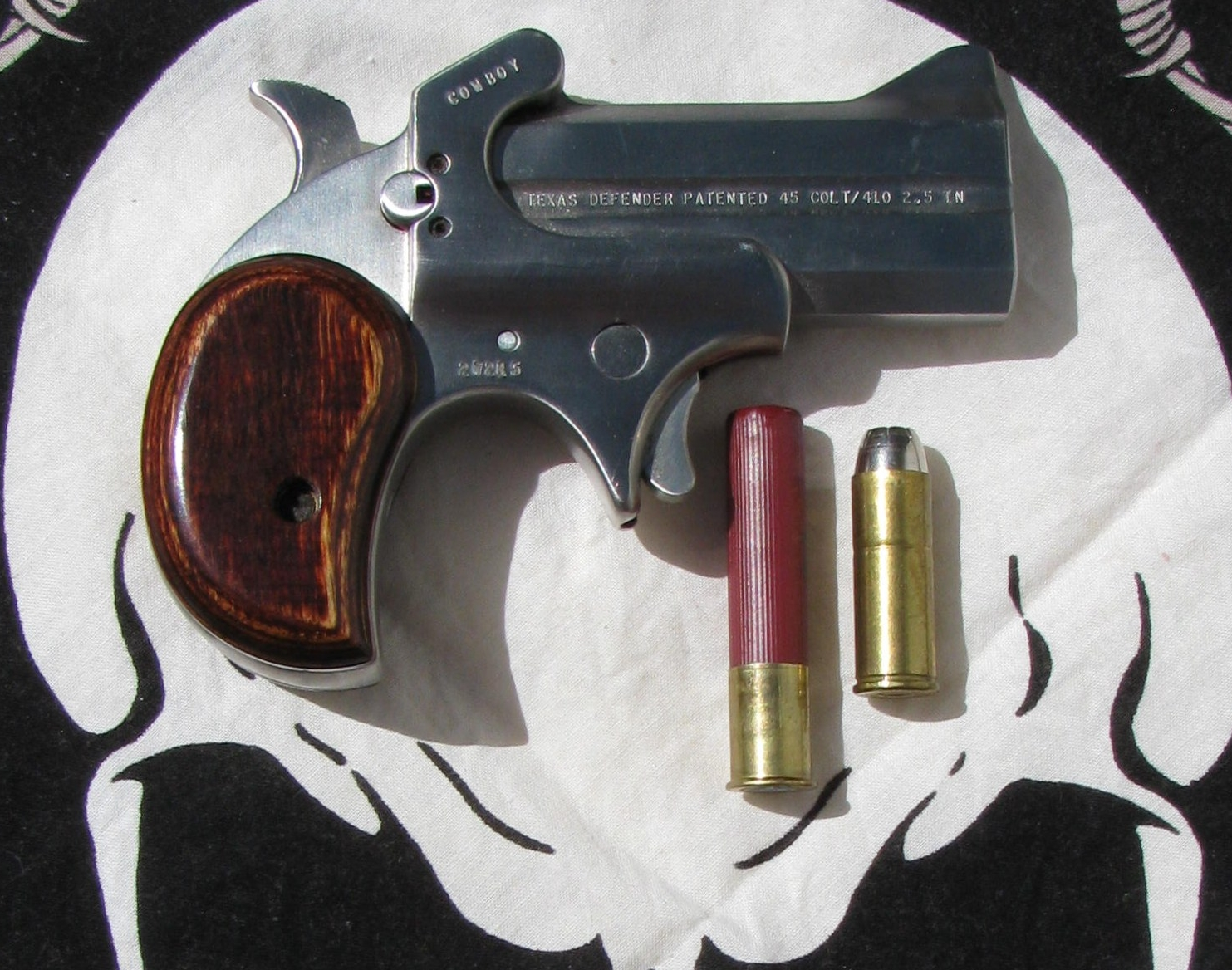
A modern .45 Colt & .410 bore Bond Arms derringer

American Derringer has long offered .45 Colt-.410 bore Derringers. Bond Arms also offers various Derringer models which chamber both .45 Colt cartridges and .410 shotshell.

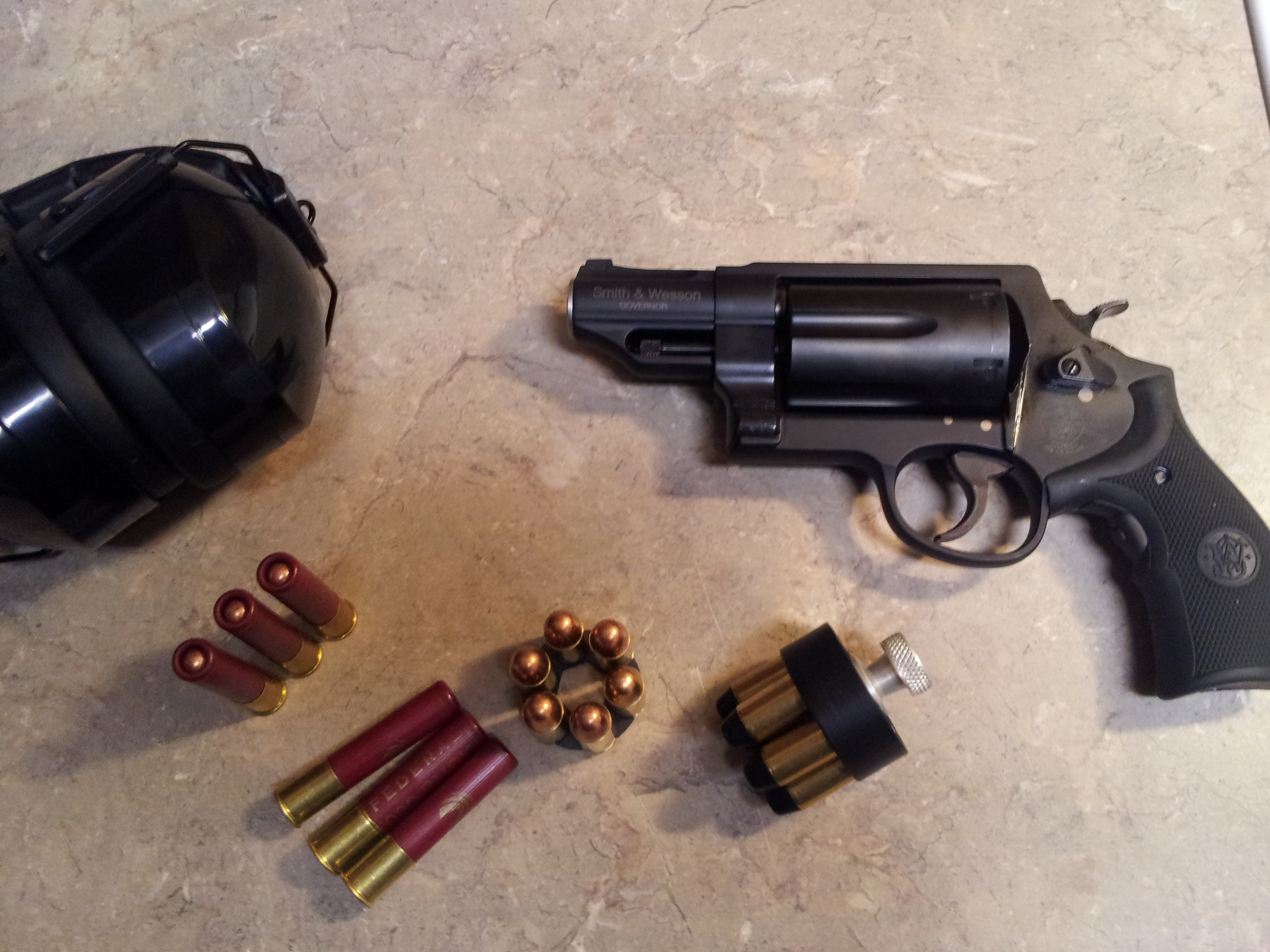
Smith & Wesson Governor with .45 ACP, .45 Colt, and .410 shotgun ammunition

Also, Taurus, Magnum Research, and Smith & Wesson offer revolvers with extended cylinders, long enough to hold .410 shells as well. Magnum Research offers a single-action revolver in their BFR (big frame revolver) line, while the Taurus Judge is similar in price to their other double-action revolvers, with the Raging Judge model capable of chambering and firing the .454 Casull cartridge. The Smith & Wesson Governor is a double-action revolver also capable of firing .45 Colt as well as .45 ACP cartridges with the aid of moon clips. The discontinued MIL Thunder 5 is also chambered in .410-bore. Over the years, a large number of devices have been made that will convert larger-gauge shotguns to accept .410 shotgun shells.

== Capacity, compared to other gauges ==
Length and load	No. 000 buckshot (.36 in)	No. 4 buckshot (.24 in)
2 1/2 in, 410 bore	3 or 4 pellets	8 pellets
3 in, 410 bore	5 pellets	9 pellets
2 3/4 in, 12 gauge	8 pellets	27 pellets
3 in, 12 gauge	10 pellets	41 pellets

Most shotgun cartridges are measured in terms of shotgun gauge. Shotgun gauge is determined by the weight of a round lead ball that is sized to fit into its barrel. For example, the barrel of a 12-gauge shotgun is equal to the diameter of a 1/12 of a pound lead ball (0.729 in) and a 20-gauge can fit a 1/20 pound lead ball (0.615 in). Using this method, a .410 bore is equivalent to a (hypothetical) 67-gauge, instead of the incorrectly labeled 36 gauge (0.506) in Europe and South America.

== See also ==
- List of rimmed cartridges
