= Bond Arms BullPup 9 =

American 9×19mm pistol

- Type: Semi-automatic pistol
- Place of origin: United States

Production history
- Manufacturer: Bond Arms
- Developed from: Boberg XR9
- Produced: 2017–Present

Specifications
- Mass: 17.5 ounces (500 g)
- Length: 5.1 inches (130 mm)
- Height: 4.2 inches (110 mm)
- Cartridge: 9x19mm Parabellum
- Action: Recoil operated (locked breech)
- Feed system: Detachable box magazine: 7+1
- Sights: 3-dot sight

The Bond Arms BullPup 9 is a centerfire semi-automatic pistol manufactured by Bond Arms beginning in 2017.

== History ==
The BullPup 9 is based on the Boberg XR9-S, which was designed by Arne Boberg and marketed by Boberg Arms between 2013 and 2016. The original intention for designing the pistol was to match the ballistic capabilities of a Glock 26 in a form factor comparable to the Ruger LCP; however reviewers reported that the loading mechanism of the XR9 was easily jammed, and that jams were difficult to clear.

In November 2015, Bond Arms acquired Boberg Arms and began modifying the XR9's design to improve reliability. The BullPup 9 was released in 2017.

== Description ==
The BullPup 9 is a recoil-operated, locked-breech semi-automatic pistol. It features a rotating barrel, similar to the Beretta 8000, and is hammer-fired with a double-action-only trigger.

To accommodate the chamber being behind the trigger, the feed mechanism is atypical. The magazine well is located directly below the chamber. When the slide is forward, a pair of spring-loaded "tongs", located below the firing pin, hook onto the rim of the top cartridge in the magazine. Upon firing, the rearward movement of the slide ejects the spent casing, extracts the cartridge from the magazine, pulls it rearward to position it on a lifting mechanism, and activates the lifter, aligning the bullet with the chamber. The forward travel of the slide loads the cartridge into the chamber, and the tongs hook onto the next round.

The feeding mechanism and rotating barrel breech lock use up a significant amount of the recoil energy produced by firing, which allows the recoil spring to be relatively light, making retracting the slide easier.
