= .454 Casull =

High power firearm cartridge

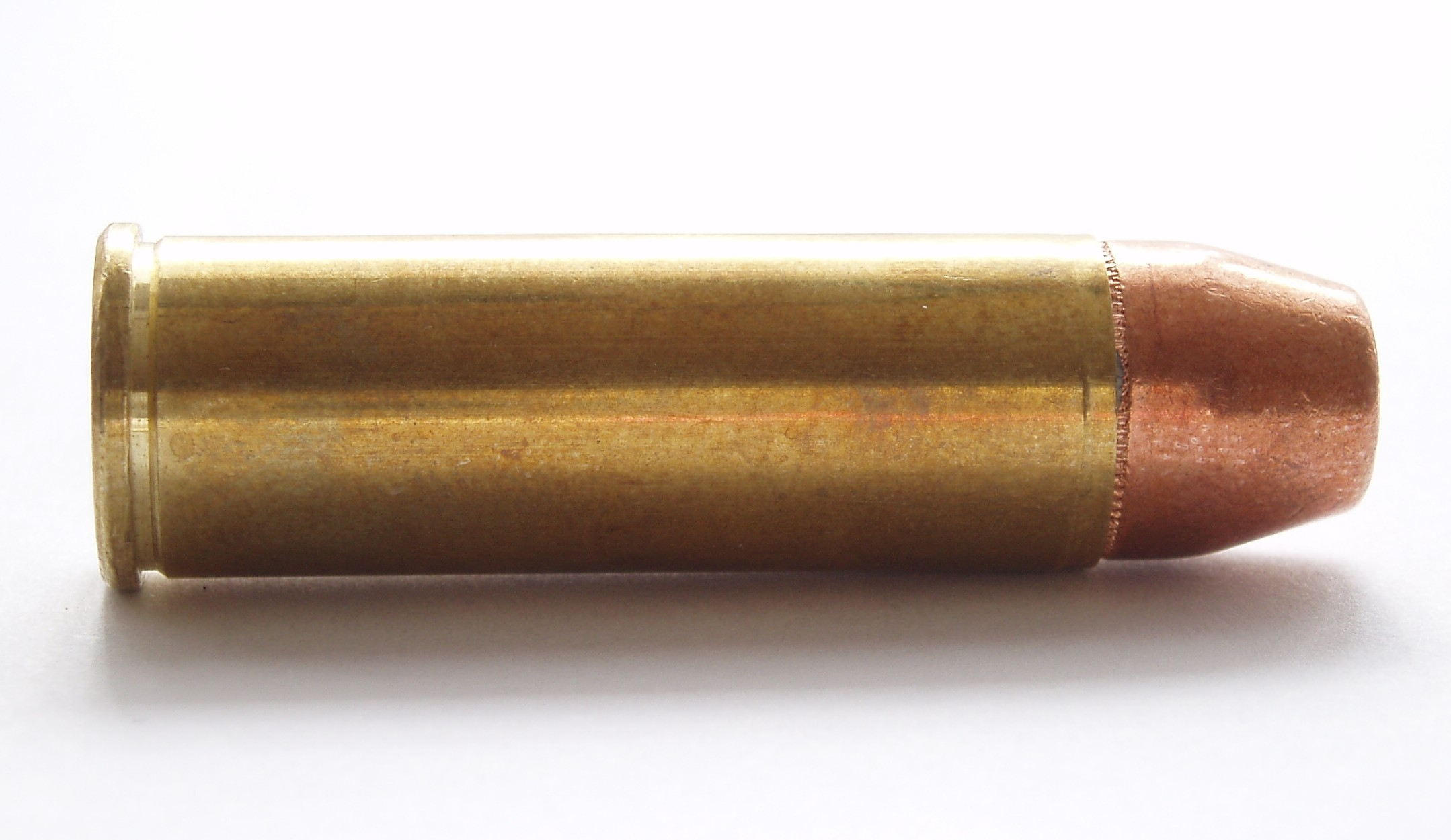
- .454 Casull FMJ (full metal jacket bullet) round
- Type: Handgun
- Place of origin: United States

Production history
- Designer: Dick Casull, Duane Marsh, Jack Fullmer
- Designed: 1958
- Produced: 1997–present

Specifications
- Parent case: .45 Colt
- Case type: Rimmed straight
- Bullet diameter: .452 in (11.5 mm)
- Land diameter: .442 in (11.2 mm)
- Neck diameter: .480 in (12.2 mm)
- Base diameter: .480 in (12.2 mm)
- Rim diameter: .512 in (13.0 mm)
- Rim thickness: .057 in (1.4 mm)
- Case length: 1.383 in (35.1 mm)
- Overall length: 1.77 in (45 mm)
- Case capacity: 45.5 gr H_{2}O (2.95 cm^{3})
- Primer type: Boxer Small rifle
- Maximum pressure (SAAMI): 65,000 psi (450 MPa)
- Maximum CUP: 50,000 CUP

Ballistic performance
Bullet mass/type	Velocity	Energy
240 gr (16 g) XTP JHP Hornady	1,900 ft/s (580 m/s)	1,923 ft⋅lbf (2,607 J)
300 gr (19 g) XTP JHP Hornady	1,650 ft/s (500 m/s)	1,813 ft⋅lbf (2,458 J)
335 gr (22 g) WFNGC DoubleTap	1,600 ft/s (490 m/s)	1,904 ft⋅lbf (2,581 J)
360 gr (23 g) WFNGC DoubleTap	1,500 ft/s (460 m/s)	1,800 ft⋅lbf (2,400 J)
400 gr (26 g) WFNGC DoubleTap	1,400 ft/s (430 m/s)	1,741 ft⋅lbf (2,360 J)
- Test barrel length: 7.5 in Source: Hornady DoubleTap

The .454 Casull (/kəˈsuːl/) is a firearm cartridge, developed as a wildcat cartridge in 1958 by Dick Casull, Duane Marsh and Jack Fullmer. It was announced in November 1959 by Guns & Ammo magazine. The design is a lengthened and structurally improved .45 Colt case. The wildcat cartridge went mainstream when Freedom Arms brought a single action five-shot revolver chambered in .454 Casull to the retail firearms market in 1983. Ruger followed in 1997, chambering its Super Redhawk in this caliber. Taurus followed with the Raging Bull model in 1998 and the Taurus Raging Judge Magnum in 2010. The .45 Schofield and .45 Colt cartridges can fit into the .454's chambers, but not the other way around because of the lengthened case (very similar to the relationship between .38 Special and .357 Magnum cartridges, as well as the .44 Special and .44 Magnum cartridges).

== Specifications ==
The .454 Casull was finally commercialized in 1997, when SAAMI published its first standards for the cartridge. The new Casull round uses a small rifle primer rather than a pistol primer, because it develops extremely high chamber pressures of over 50,000 CUP (copper units of pressure) (410 MPa), which are rifle levels of pressure. It requires the use of a rifle primer to withstand those significantly greater pressures, blurring the distinction of it being a pistol or a rifle cartridge.

The round is one of the most powerful handgun cartridges in production. The .454 Casull generates almost five times the recoil of the .45 Colt, and about 75% more recoil energy than the .44 Magnum. It can deliver a 250 grain (16 g) bullet with a muzzle velocity of over 1,900 feet per second (580 m/s), developing up to 2,000 ft-lb (2.7 kJ) of energy from a handgun. One Buffalo Bore loading drives a heavier, 300 grain, JFN bullet at 1,650 ft/s for 1,813 ft-lb of muzzle energy. The .454 Casull round is primarily intended for hunting medium or large game, metallic silhouette shooting, and bear protection.

The Casull cartridges were originally loaded with a triplex load of propellants, which gave progressive burning, aided by the rifle primer ignition, resulting in a progressive acceleration of the bullet as it passed through the barrel.

== Similar cartridges ==
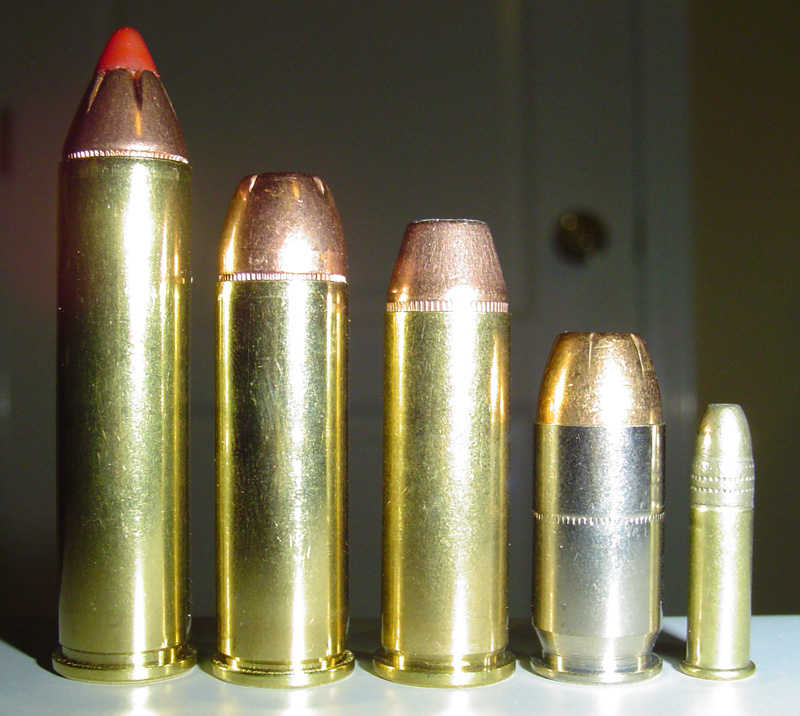
Left to right: .460 S&W Magnum, .454 Casull, .44 Magnum, .45 ACP, and .22 LR

The first commercially available revolver chambered in .454 Casull was made by Freedom Arms in 1983 as a five-shot single action Model 83 revolver that is capable of firing .45 ACP, .45 Colt and .454 Casull with interchangeable cylinders. The .460 Smith & Wesson Magnum cartridge introduced in 2005 is a lengthened .454 Casull cartridge and has the same diameter as a .45 Colt or .454 Casull. Therefore, revolvers chambered for .460 S&W will also chamber .454 Casull, .45 Colt, and .45 Schofield (.45 Smith & Wesson).

== See also ==
- .44 AMP
- .500 S&W Magnum
- 11 mm caliber
- List of cartridges by caliber
- List of handgun cartridges
- Table of handgun and rifle cartridges
