= Ruger Redhawk =

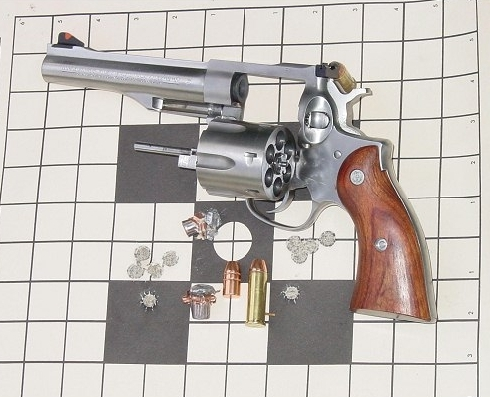
- Redhawk with 5.5-inch barrel
- Type: Revolver
- Place of origin: United States

Production history
- Manufacturer: Sturm, Ruger & Company Southport, Conn
- Produced: 1979–2026

Specifications
- Mass: 3.0625 lb (1.386 kg)
- Length: 9.5–13 inches (241.3–330.2 mm)
- Barrel length: 4 inch (101.6 mm); 4.2 inch (106.7 mm); 5.5 inch (139.7 mm); 7.5 inch (190.5 mm)
- Cartridge: .357 Magnum/.38 Special; .41 Magnum (discontinued); .44 Magnum/.44 Special; .45 Colt (discontinued 2019); .45 ACP/.45 Colt
- Action: Single and double action
- Feed system: Six or Eight round cylinder
- Sights: iron sights (adjustable rear)

The Ruger Redhawk is a DA/SA, large-frame revolver introduced in 1979 by Sturm, Ruger & Company. In October 2026, Ruger announced the discontinuation of the Redhawk, along with several other firearms, to focus on production of other models.

== Design and construction ==
The Redhawk is the first large-bore double-action revolver introduced by Ruger. It was designed by Roy Melcher and Harry Sefried. Sefried previously worked for High Standard Manufacturing Company, where he designed the High Standard Sentinel revolver.

Announced in 1979, the Redhawk began shipping to customers in 1980, and was chambered in .44 Magnum caliber. The revolver featured a square butt grip, adjustable sights, and 5.5- and 7.5-inch barrel lengths, and was available in blue or stainless steel finishes. While the grip profile and no-sideplate construction of the Redhawk was similar to that of the earlier Ruger Security-Six, it was in fact a new design, incorporating a much larger and heavier frame.

Designed for use with the heaviest .44 Magnum loads, the Redhawk included a triple lock, where the cylinder is locked in place at front, rear, and bottom (a feature previously found solely on Smith & Wesson's triple lock .44 Hand Ejector design, out of production since 1915). Sefried himself observed that the triple lockup design "would last almost indefinitely". To simplify the design and cut the number of parts, the Redhawk used a single coil spring to power both hammer and trigger, resulting in a slightly heavier trigger pull in single action mode. Because of the single power spring, Redhawk revolvers typically show little disparity between single and double-action pull weights - often three pounds or less in variation.

The revolver has forward ramp sights with four different interchangeable sight inserts. The rear sights are fully adjustable, featuring a white outline. The Redhawk is available with scope mounts and rings. The Redhawk holds six or eight cartridges depending upon caliber, and has been produced with 4-inch, 4.2-inch, 5.5-inch, and 7.5-inch barrels.

=== Calibers ===
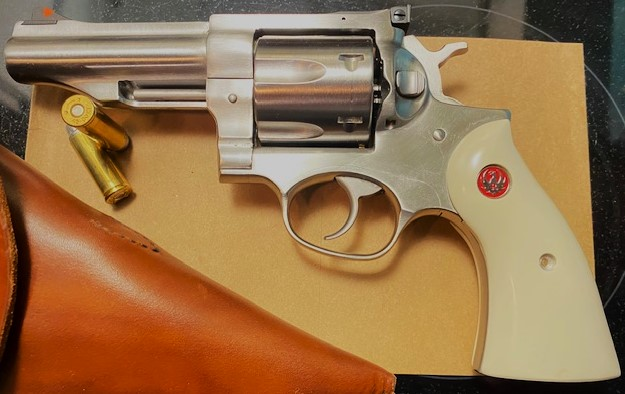
Model 5027 .45 Colt Ruger Redhawk

When first introduced, the Redhawk was offered only in .44 Magnum caliber, which also chambered the .44 Special cartridge. In the following years, the Redhawk was offered in .41 Magnum, .357 Magnum, and .45 Colt. In 2015, a dual-caliber .45 ACP/.45 Colt chambering was introduced. Redhawks in .41 Magnum and .45 Colt calibers have since been discontinued.

=== Variants ===
In June 2015 Ruger announced a .45 Colt / .45 ACP dual caliber chambering for the Redhawk that incorporates a redesigned grip frame with round-butt grip. Ruger achieves this multi-cartridge functionality by partially machining the cylinder to allow use of thin-gauge moon clips for the rimless .45 ACP while still retaining enough cylinder surface for proper headspace of the rimmed .45 Colt cartridge.^{,}

== Usage ==
Despite the introduction of the Ruger Super Redhawk, the Redhawk remains in production today. Many shooters prefer the more compact frame of the Redhawk for hunting and self-protection, especially those who do not plan to use a scope.

The explorer Sir Ranulph Fiennes carried a .44 magnum Redhawk on the 14-month-long Transglobe Expedition and used it to ward off a polar bear.

== Production issues ==
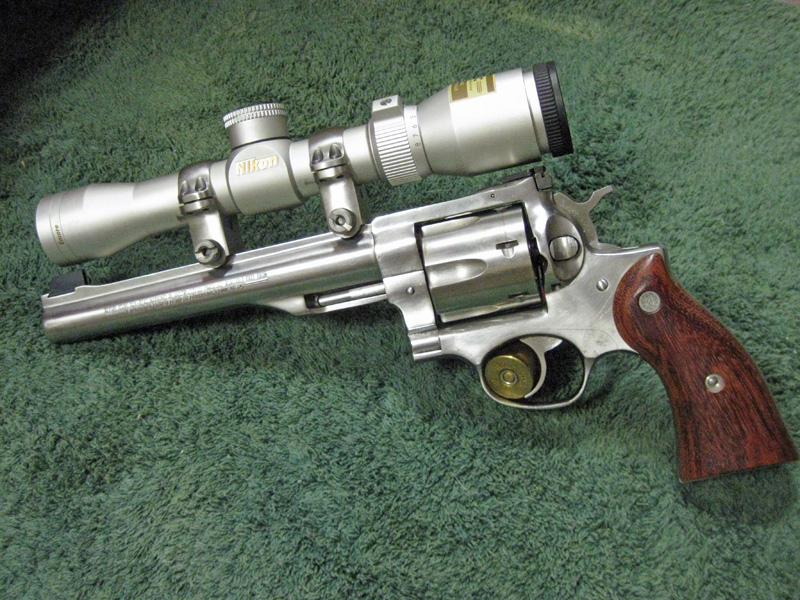
A 1980s Ruger Redhawk Hunter in .44 Magnum with a custom scope.

During the mid-1980s, Ruger received reports of barrel failures in the Redhawk. The barrels of some Redhawk revolvers had separated at the junction between barrel and frame. The cause of the barrel separation was not known at the time, nor why it had not occurred before, since the Redhawk had been on the market since 1980. Ruger initially addressed the issue by introducing a new receiver design, lengthening the frame 2.5 inches past the cylinder face to the end of the ejector rod. The new design greatly increased barrel support. The extended frame also provided enough length to allow scope bases to be mounted on the frame, rather than the barrel mount required on scoped versions of the older Redhawk. This new design, dubbed the Ruger Super Redhawk also introduced a revised stub grip similar to that of the Ruger GP100 revolver.

It was later determined by Ruger engineers that the Redhawk barrel separations were the result of overtorquing threads on pre-lubricated barrels as they were being screwed to the frame, causing stress fractures. Ruger corrected this problem with revised assembly procedures. However, since the new Super Redhawk design was already complete, and because the original Redhawk remained in popular demand, the decision was made to retain both the Redhawk and the Super Redhawk in production.
