= MAG-7 =

Techno Arms MAG-7
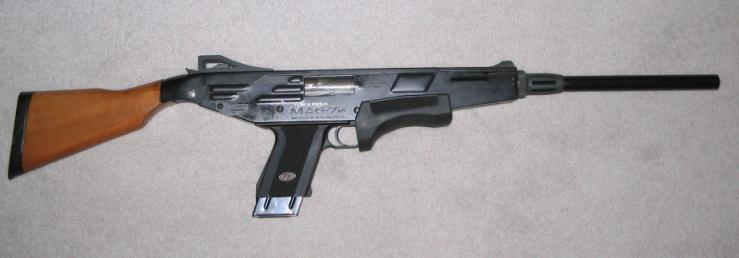
- M1 version (US civilian-legal version)
- Type: Pump-action shotgun
- Place of origin: South Africa

Production history
- Designed: 1995
- Produced: 1995–present
- Variants: MAG-7; MAG-7M1

Specifications
- Mass: 4 kg (8.2 lb)
- Length: 550 mm (21.6 in)
- Barrel length: 320 mm (12.6 in)
- Cartridge: 12 gauge (60 mm cartridges)
- Action: Pump-action
- Effective firing range: 40 m (45 yd)
- Feed system: 5 cartridge removable box magazine

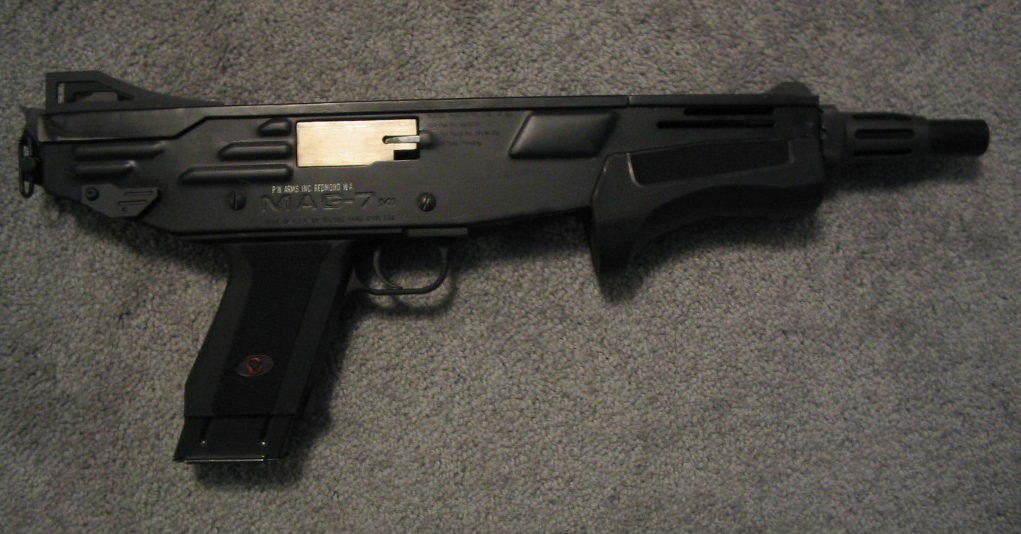
MAG7-M1 (SBS Form)

The MAG-7 is a pump-action shotgun manufactured by Techno Arms PTY of South Africa since 1995.

== History and design ==
The MAG-7 was developed as a close quarters combat (CQC) weapon which would combine the aspects of a compact submachine gun and a pump-action shotgun.

For ease of reloading, a magazine system is ideal. With the traditional pump-action mechanism located under the barrel, there is no convenient forward location for a magazine. This leaves the bullpup layout or a pistol-like arrangement of placing the magazine within the pistol grip as possible configurations. It was found that the standard 12-gauge shotgun shell at 70mm (2.75 in) was too long to comfortably hold in the desired pistol grip mounting.

However, it was also found that at the ranges being considered for this weapon, the standard shotgun shells had too much power. This led to the development of a shorter 60mm (2.36 in) shotshell, instead of the longer and more common 70mm (2.75) shotshell, with both the desired power and size. The use of the MAG-7 with these cartridges yields an effective range of 45 yards (41.1 m), although they have a proven lethality to 90 yards (82 m). The MAG-7 also has a detachable, top-folding sheet metal stock.

There were two models initially manufactured—the original MAG-7, and a civilian-legal model, called the MAG-7 M1. The M1 features a longer barrel and fixed wooden stock to extend the barrel to 18 inches (46 cm) and the overall length to 26 inches (66 cm) to meet the requirements of the National Firearms Act, and of the gun laws of many other countries. The civilian model is less representative of the original compact and hard-hitting close-quarters combat design.

== Service ==
Although the design concept was geared towards law enforcement and military close-quarters combat scenarios, there was inadequate demand for the weapon due to some problematic design issues in its conception. One such design feature was the safety lever on the left side of the stamped steel receiver, above the pistol grip. The actuation of this lever is not possible without removing the left hand from the pump, and is difficult if the operator is wearing gloves. The same problem exists for the slide lock button. These problems were mainly found in the early models exported to the United States. The company then focused its attention on these issues, and they were solved by reducing the resistance of the safety lever and slide lock button. The user can now operate both levers effectively and easily without taking the left hand off the pump. Another issue that plagued the MAG-7 was the 7.7 kilogram-force (kgf) trigger pull. This was also addressed by the manufacturer when the force was reduced to the industry standard 3.5 kgf.

== Proprietary ammunition ==
Swartklip made the original 12 gauge 2.36-inch [18.5 x 60mm] shells for Techno Arms in UK No.5 shot [EU/US No.6 Birdshot], UK/EU AAA shot [US T shot], UK/EU SSG shot [US #2 Buckshot], and 12 gauge rubber slug. The original 2.36-inch [18.5 x 60mm] length shotshells are difficult to obtain. However, other shells can be used instead:

- Aguila Ammunition Company of Mexico's 12 gauge 1.75-inch [18.5 x 44.5mm] "Mini-Shells" can be substituted and will fit in the magazine and fire but will not feed reliably. They come in US No.7½ Birdshot, US #1 Buckshot, and 12 gauge lead slug in packs of 20 shells.
- Century International's Centurion brand 12 gauge 2-inch [18.5 x 51 mm] Mini Buckshot shells also work in the chamber as well, though not as reliably as the 60mm cartridge. They come in EU/US #00 Buck (similar to British SG or Australian 00-SG) in packs of 10 shells.
- Centurion brand 12 gauge 2.25-inch [18.5 x 57.4mm] Minibuck "00" shells.
- Standard-length 12 gauge 2.75-inch [18.5 x 70mm] cartridges can have their cases shortened to reliably feed in the 60mm chamber.

== Current status ==
The manufacturer, Techno Arms (PTY) Ltd., located in Modderfontein, Gauteng, South Africa, as of March 2012 is active and is marketing the MAG-7 in three versions: the standard MAG-7, the civilian-legal MAG-7 M1, and the M7 Dual Riot.

== M7 Dual Riot ==
The M7 is a combination 12-gauge and 37mm / 38mm weapon based upon the standard MAG-7. It has a fixed metal stock and a top-mounted 37mm or 38 mm single-shot less-lethal launcher with a tilting barrel. The launcher is extremely reminiscent of the widely popular South African Milkor Stopper 37/38 mm riot gun, which Techno Arms now also manufactures. It is designed as an anti-riot Law Enforcement weapon that can fire both 12 gauge rubber shot or 37-mm / 38-mm gas shells.

== See also ==
- List of shotguns
