= Bond Arms =

Texan gun manufacturer

Bond Arms Inc.
- Formerly: Texas Arms
- Type: Corporation
- Industry: Firearms
- Founded: 1995; 31 years ago
- Founder: Greg Bond
- Headquarters: Granbury, Texas, USA
- Products: Derringers, Semiautomatics, Lever-Action Tactical Rifle, Holsters, Barrels, Grips, .410 handguns
- Owner: Gordon Bond
- Number of employees: 40
- Website: bondarms.com

Bond Arms Inc. is an American firearms manufacturer located in Granbury, Texas which makes derringers, the semi-automatic BullPup9 pistol, and announced plans to put a tactical lever-action rifle into production by the end of 2023.

== History ==
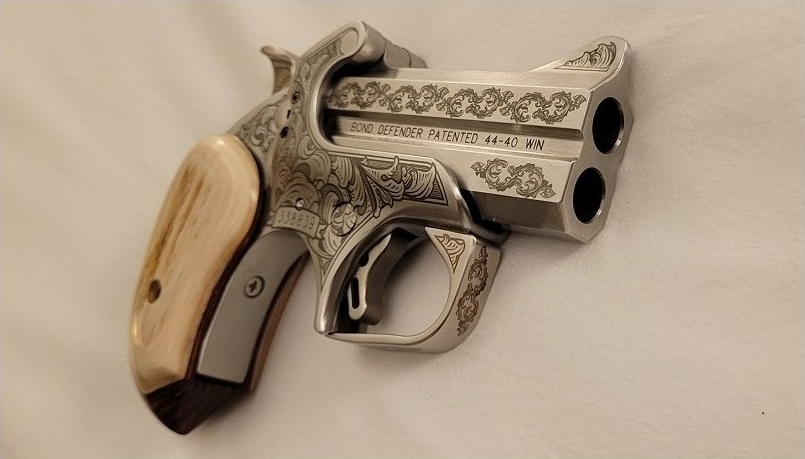
Bond Arms Texas Defender with custom engraving and mammoth tusk grips

In 1995, Bond Arms was founded by longtime tool and die maker Greg Bond, in Granbury, Texas.

Between the 1860s and the mid-1990s, derringers had largely gone unchanged in both design and safety, until Greg Bond added a trigger guard, invented the "rebounding hammer", retractable firing pins, and added a crossbolt safety. The company was formerly known as "Texas Arms" out of Waco, Texas. Bond Arms became incorporated in 1995 and was licensed by the BATFE as a firearms manufacturer and dealer.

Greg's brother, Gordon Bond, bought the company from Greg in 2007 and has since been the owner and president of the company.

Bond Arms is the largest manufacturer of derringers in the firearms industry.

== Products ==
=== Derringers ===
Bond Arms derringers are modular and made in a variety of centerfire calibers including: .380 ACP, 9mm Parabellum, .40 S&W, .30 Carbine, .327 Federal Magnum, .357 Magnum/.38 Special, 10mm, .44-40 Winchester, .44 Magnum, .44 Special, .45 ACP, .45 Long Colt/.410 Shotshell, 45-70 Gov't, and .50 Action Express. The three most popular models are the Texas Defender, Rowdy, and Snake Slayer Derringers. The trigger guard is removable for a more traditional appearance on the original and the Rough series. Bond Arms constructs their traditional derringers in such a way that a user can change barrels and switch from one caliber to another. Grips are also constructed in such a way that users can change from a compact grip, to an extended grip, or to a jumbo grip.

In late 2014, Bond Arms introduced two California-legal models called the Big Bear and the Brown Bear. But, they have since ceased all business in California, due to the 1986 California Proposition 65.

In 2018, Bond Arms introduced the Rough series which are structurally identical to the classical derringer line, but are not as highly polished. These have a much lower cost per unit and are designed to be used in a tougher environment than the original line.

In 2020, Bond Arms saw the introduction of the Stinger which is an aluminum frame derringer available only in 9mm Parabellum and .380 ACP, as it is only .88 inches (22.4 mm) thick and 12 ounces (0.3 kg). This new line is not compatible with the accessory barrels, and the trigger guard is molded into the rest of the frame. They are intended for deep concealment. In the summer of 2022, Bond Arms released the Stinger RS (Rough Series) which has a stainless steel frame and weighs 16 ounces (0.5 kg).

In January 2023, Bond Arms unveiled the Cyclops chambered in 45-70 Gov't at SHOT Show in Las Vegas. This was followed up with a .44 Magnum version later in the year and a .50 AE version in 2024. Unlike the other derringers by Bond Arms, the Cyclops barrel is a single-shot. Bond Arms also released the Honey B, Stubby, and the Rowdy XL at the same time as the Cyclops.

=== Semiautomatics ===
Bond Arms acquired the rights to the Boberg XR9-S bullpup semi-automatic pistol, it has now been redesigned and marketed as the Bond Arms BullPup 9. The Bond Arms BullPup 9 has a 3.35 inches (85.1 mm) long barrel, is 5.1 inches (129.5 mm) in overall length, and only weighs 17.5 ounces (0.5 kg). It is chambered in 9mm Parabellum with a 7+1 capacity and has a double-action-only (DAO) trigger pull of 6.5 foot-pounds force (8.8 J).

=== Rifles ===
Also at SHOT Show 2023, Bond Arms unveiled a tactical-style lever-action rifle, which was eventually named the LVRB. The LVRB uses a proprietary lever action in conjunction with a magazine-fed frame matched with an AR-style upper. This concept allows gun owners to have a high-capacity rifle in areas where semiautomatic firearm use and ownership would not be possible. Furthermore, the mechanism of the lever allows the strip of full-size rifle cartridges from the magazine and not just shorter pistol ammunition. This gives the LVRB a great advantage versus other tactical lever-action rifles being released by only a few other companies. The design was creative enough to be awarded "Best in Show" by RECOIL Magazine.

=== Accessories ===
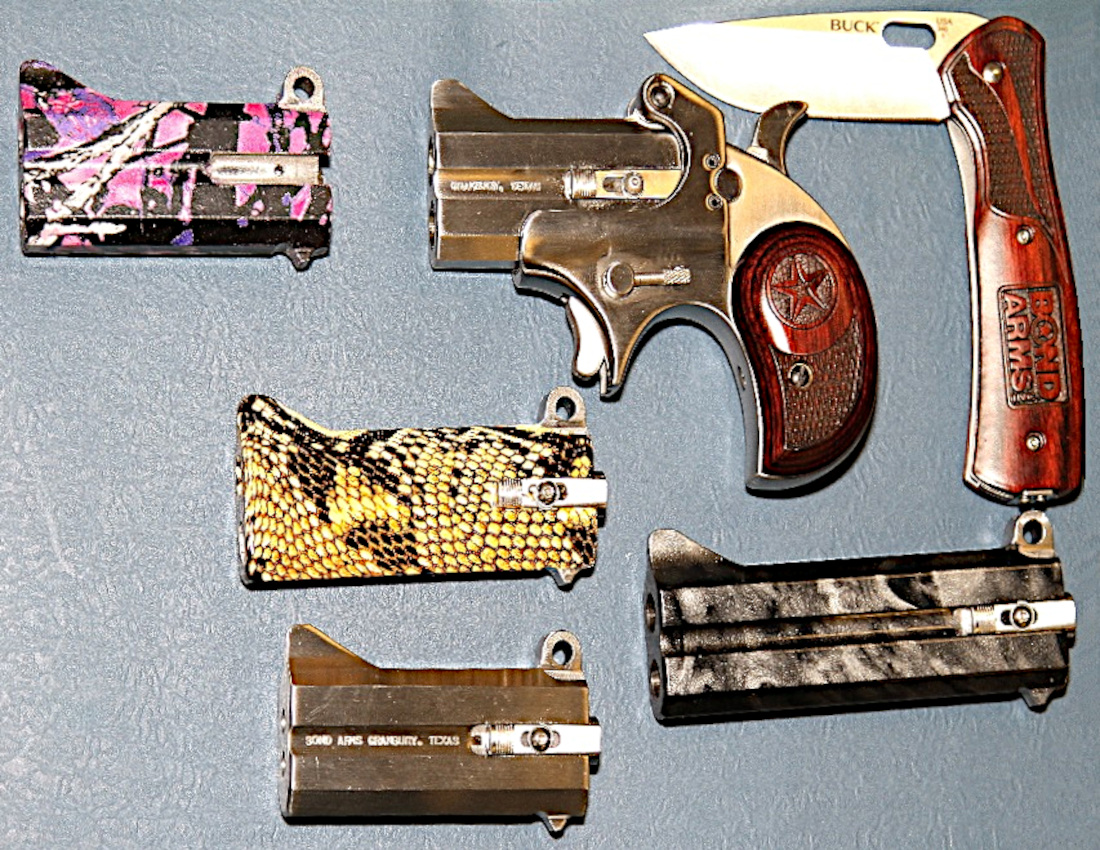
The Bond Arms System features total interchangeability

Bond Arms offers custom grip panels, holsters, and interchangeable barrel sets, which are currently only sold through other retailers.

== See also ==
Derringer manufacturers

- American Derringer
- Cobra Arms
- Davis Industries

Others

- Snake Charmer (shotgun)
