= .45 Colt =

Revolver cartridge designed by the U.S. Army

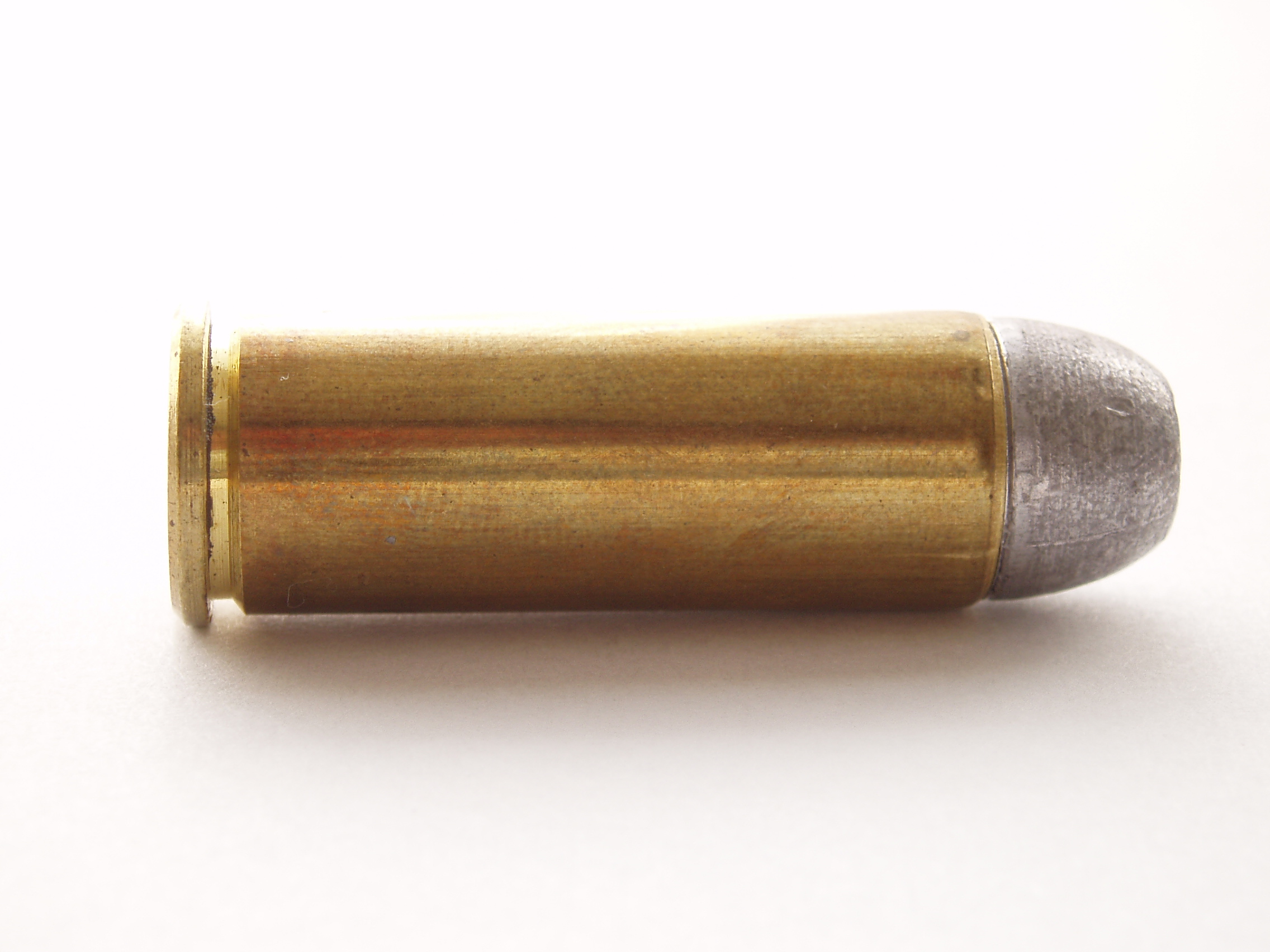
- Type: Revolver
- Place of origin: United States

Service history
- In service: 1873–1892, 1909–1917
- Used by: United States
- Wars: Indian Wars, Spanish–American War, Philippine–American War, Moro Rebellion

Production history
- Designer: U.S. Army
- Designed: 1872
- Produced: 1873–present
- Variants: .45 Colt +P

Specifications
- Case type: Rimmed, straight
- Bullet diameter: .452 in (11.5 mm)
- Neck diameter: .480 in (12.2 mm)
- Base diameter: .480 in (12.2 mm)
- Rim diameter: .512 in (13.0 mm)
- Rim thickness: .060 in (1.5 mm)
- Case length: 1.285 in (32.6 mm)
- Overall length: 1.600 in (40.6 mm)
- Case capacity: 41.60 gr H_{2}O (2.696 cm^{3})
- Rifling twist: 1 in 16 in (410 mm)
- Primer type: Large Pistol
- Maximum pressure (CIP): 15,900 psi (110 MPa)
- Maximum pressure (SAAMI): 14,000 psi (97 MPa)

Ballistic performance
Bullet mass/type	Velocity	Energy
160 gr (10 g) TAC XP, Double Tap	1,125 ft/s (343 m/s)	450 ft⋅lbf (610 J)
200 gr (13 g) JHP, Buffalo Bore	1,000 ft/s (300 m/s)	444 ft⋅lbf (602 J)
250 gr (16 g) Nosler JHP, Double Tap	900 ft/s (270 m/s)	450 ft⋅lbf (610 J)
300 gr (19 g) JSP +P, Cor-Bon	1,300 ft/s (400 m/s)	1,126 ft⋅lbf (1,527 J)
360 gr (23 g) Nosler JHP +P, Double Tap	1,200 ft/s (370 m/s)	1,151 ft⋅lbf (1,561 J)

The .45 Colt (11.43×33mmR), often called the .45 Long Colt, is a rimmed straight-walled, centerfire handgun cartridge dating to 1872. It was originally a black-powder revolver round developed for the Colt Single Action Army revolver. This cartridge was adopted by the U.S. Army in 1873 and served as an official US military handgun cartridge for 19 years, before being replaced by the .38 Long Colt in 1892. Although there has never been a ".45 Short Colt" cartridge, there was a ".45 Colt Gov" cartridge produced for a short time with a slightly shorter case sharing the same rim diameter as the .45 colt and using a reduced powder charge, not to be confused with the .45 Schofield with a larger rim diameter, which was also in use around the same time as the .45 Colt and able to be used in revolvers chambered in the more powerful Colt round.

== History ==
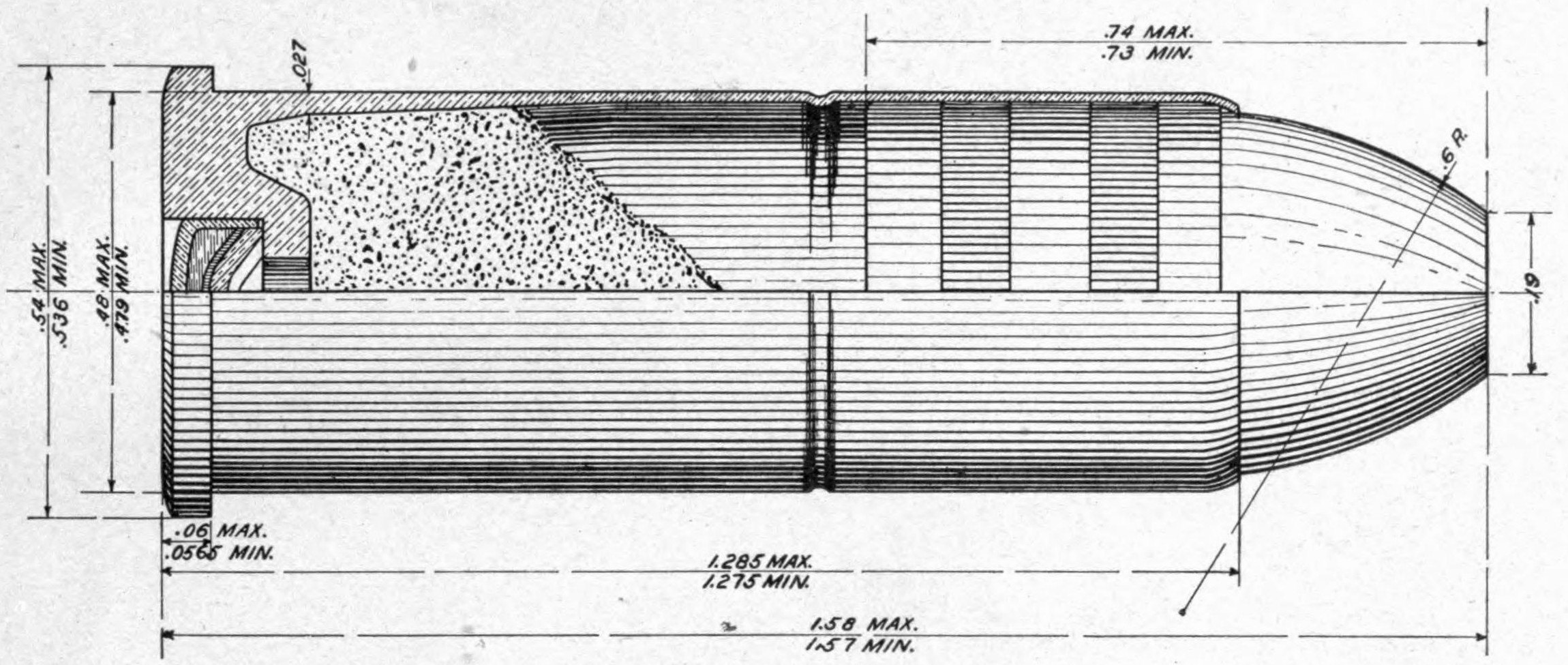
Diagram of the .45 Colt U.S. Army "ball cartridge" for the Army M1909 revolver, with dimensions in inches

The .45 Colt was a joint development between Colt's Patent Firearms Manufacturing Company (now known as Colt's Manufacturing Company), of Hartford, Connecticut, and the Union Metallic Cartridge Company (UMC) of Bridgeport, Connecticut. Colt began work on the revolver in 1871, and submitted a sample to the U.S. Army in late 1872. The revolver was accepted for purchase in 1873.

The cartridge is an inside lubricated type. The rebated heel type bullet design of its predecessor, the .44 Colt (.452-.454-inch diameter bullet), was eliminated, since it was an outside lubricated type, which would pick up dirt and grit during handling. The .45 Colt replaced the .50 caliber Model 1871 Remington single shot pistol and the various cap-and-ball revolvers converted to take metallic cartridges in use at the time. While the Colt remained popular, the Smith & Wesson M1875 Army Schofield Revolver was approved as an alternate, which created a logistical problem for the Army. The S&W revolver used the .45 Schofield, a shorter cartridge, which would also work in the Colt, however the Army's S&W Schofield revolvers could not chamber the longer .45 Colt; so in 1874, Frankford Arsenal, the almost exclusive supplier of small arms ammunition to the U.S. Army at the time, dropped production of the .45 Colt cartridge in favor of the .45 Schofield. This resolved the Army's ammunition logistics problems, but there were still plenty of the longer Colt-length cartridges in circulation once production ceased. The Benet primed .45 Revolver cartridges were subsequently replaced by the "Model of 1882 Ball Cartridge for Cal. .45 Revolver" which used an external Boxer primer and could be reloaded at the unit level. The .45 caliber M1882 cartridge would be officially replaced by the .38 Long Colt in 1892 but would remain in production until 1896. In 1901–1902, it would once again be loaded by Frankford Arsenal for use in the Philippine–American War.

In 1909, the newly adopted .45 M1909 cartridge was issued along with the .45 Colt New Service revolver. This round was never loaded commercially, and is almost identical to the original .45 Colt round, except for having a larger diameter rim (.540 in (13.7mm)). The rim is large enough that it cannot be loaded in adjacent chambers in the rod-ejector Colt model.

== Cartridge loads ==
The .45 Colt originally was a black-powder cartridge, but modern loadings use smokeless powder. The original black-powder loads called for 40 grains (2.6 g) of black powder behind an Ogival & flat nosed 255-grain (16.5 g) lead bullet. These loads developed muzzle velocities of 850 ft/s (260 m/s) to 900 ft/s (270 m/s). However, this load generated too much recoil for the average soldier and was, after a few years, reduced to 34 gr (2.2 g) of black powder yielding 800 ft/s (240 m/s). Then, the introduction of the Schofield revolver with its shorter cylinder, quick loading "Top-Break" frame, and chambered in .45 Schofield caused a problem for the Supply Corps in that they now had to supply two different types of .45 Caliber revolver ammunition. Further troubles were caused by the fact that the Schofield cartridge rim was too wide to load into adjacent chambers in the Colt cylinder, turning the Colt into a three shooter (being able to only place a round in every other chamber), if the wrong ammunition was sent to that particular outpost. To solve the problem, the Army introduced a ".45 Colt Government" cartridge, with the narrow rim of the .45 Colt and short case of the .45 Schofield, that only held 28 gr (1.8 g) of black powder that could be used in both revolvers. That load gave about 735 ft/s (224 m/s) with a 230 gr (15 g) bullet out of the Schofield revolver with its shorter barrel. Because of the power of the 40 gr (2.6 g) of black powder and its excellent accuracy, the .45 Colt was known as a sure man stopper and horse killer. It became the most-used cartridge at the time of its introduction, succeeding the .44-40 Winchester.

The .45 Colt at that time did not enjoy the .44-40's advantage of a Winchester rifle chambered for it being available, thus allowing the use of the same cartridge in both a pistol and a rifle. According to rumor at the time, this was owing to early .45 Colt cartridges having a very narrow rim that caused ejection issues from a rifle chamber. Today, modern Winchesters, Marlins, and other replicas have remedied this omission almost 50 years after the fact, and .45 Colt is now available in modern lever-action rifles.

While this aforementioned rumor has been one of the numerous arguments used to explain the lack of a rifle chambered in .45 Colt, it may have simply been a case of Colt refusing to authorize the use of their patented .45 Colt cartridge in other manufacturers' arms. Only after the expiration of Colt's original patents for the .45 Colt did it become available in a rifle. This, however, does not explain the absence of a .45 Colt chambering (or indeed any of Colt's own cartridges) in the Colt-Burgess lever-action or Colt Lightning slide-action rifles. Thus lending more credence to the rumored basic problem with Colt's revolver cartridges when used in rifles. The modern .45 Colt cartridge rim is still narrow, but features an extractor groove cut into the base of the case, a feature common to most modern cartridges but not at all common in the late 19th century.

The U.S. Army's .45 Colt round used in its M1909 revolver, which had a barrel of 5.5 inches (140 mm), fired a 250-grain (16 g) bullet at a muzzle velocity of 738 ft/s (225 m/s), giving a muzzle energy of 297 ft⋅lbf (403 J). Today's standard factory loads develop around 400 ft⋅lbf (540 J) of muzzle energy at about 860 ft/s (260 m/s), making it roughly equivalent to modern .45 ACP loads. There are Cowboy Action Shooting loads which develop muzzle velocities of around 750 ft/s (230 m/s).

Cartridges of the World states that .45 Colt should never be loaded to more than 800 ft/s (240 m/s) in blackpowder revolvers.

=== High pressure ammunition ===
Some handloads and factory-manufactured cartridges put this round in the same class as the .44 Magnum, using specially made revolvers. These loads cannot be used in any original Colt Single Action Army or replica thereof, such as those produced by Uberti, Beretta, the Taurus Gaucho, or the Ruger New Vaquero, as these guns are built on the smaller frame with thinner cylinder walls. These loads should be used only in modern large-frame revolvers such as the Ruger Blackhawk, Ruger Redhawk, and the original large frame Ruger Vaquero (sometimes referred to as the "Old Model" to differentiate it from the small frame "New Vaquero".)

Thompson Center Contender "Magnum" .45 Colt loadings can also be safely fired from any gun chambered in either the .454 Casull or .460 S&W Magnum cartridges, though proper feeding may be an issue in repeating rifles chambered for either .454 Casull or .460 S&W Magnum as the OAL is significantly shorter. Modern rifles with strong actions (such as the Winchester Model 1894, Marlin Model 1894, and new replicas of the Winchester Model 1892) chambered for the cartridge can safely handle the heavier loadings.

=== Handloading ===
Colt .45 revolvers made until early WWII had barrels with .454-inch (11.5 mm) groove diameters. After WWII diameters of .451–.452 inches were produced. Using .454-inch diameter bullets in the smaller barrels will work but will generate higher pressures. Cases used with .454-inch bullets may have to be full-length resized to work in newer guns. Speer handloading guidance states that the loads they show should be used only in handguns made specifically for modern smokeless powder. The loads mentioned in No. 10 reloading manual state that they do not exceed 15,000 psi (100 MPa). This is the equivalent of +P loading as normal pressure for the .45 Colt is 14,000 psi (97 MPa).

In a section specifically titled "45 Colt for Ruger or Contender only", Speer makes reference to velocities up to 1,300 ft/s (400 m/s) with 200 gr (13 g) bullets. They also state that pressures do not exceed 25,000 psi (170 MPa) (CUP). This is well beyond a pressure that can destroy even modern guns chambered in .45 Colt with the exception of the large frame Ruger Blackhawk, Ruger Redhawk, Freedom Arms Models 83 and 97, and Dan Wesson revolvers.

== Uses ==
Colt began work on their 1873 Single Action Army Model in 1871. Sample cartridges submitted for Army tests were made by UMC, using the Benet cup primers; commercial ammunition used the Berdan-type primer, followed by the more common Boxer priming. Original UMC loads used a 40-grain (2.6 g) powder charge and 255-grain (16.5 g) bullet. This was reduced to 35-grain (2.3 g) of powder, and later, by the Army, to 28-grain (1.8 g).

The .45 Colt cartridge remains in use 153 years after its introduction. It is used as a hunting load on animals the size of deer and black bear. Heavier handloads will take the same range of big game animals as the .44 Magnum. Several two-barrel derringers are sold that are chambered in .45 Colt, and some of these derringers can chamber a .410 bore shotgun shell without any modifications being required. Revolvers chambered in .410 shotgun, such as the Taurus Judge and the Smith & Wesson Governor, are usually chambered for the .45 Colt as well. A popular use for the .45 Colt today is in Cowboy Action Shooting, where the round is often fired from either original or replicas of the 1873 Colt Single-Action Army.

Winchester, Marlin Firearms, Henry Repeating Arms, Chiappa Firearms, Rossi, Uberti, Cimarron Firearms and other manufacturers produce lever-action rifles chambered in .45 Colt. Colt has resumed production of the Single-Action Army, and many SAA replicas and near-replicas as well as modern-design single-actions by Ruger are chambered for this cartridge.

== Influence on other cartridges ==
The .45 Colt became the basis for the much more powerful .454 Casull cartridge, with the .454 Casull having a slightly longer case utilizing a small rifle primer in place of the large pistol primer. Any .454 Casull revolver will chamber and fire the .45 Colt and the .45 Schofield, but not the inverse due to the Casull's longer case. The .460 S&W Magnum is a longer version of the .454 Casull cartridge. Likewise, .460 Magnum revolvers can chamber and fire the three shorter cartridges, but again, not the reverse.

== Gallery ==
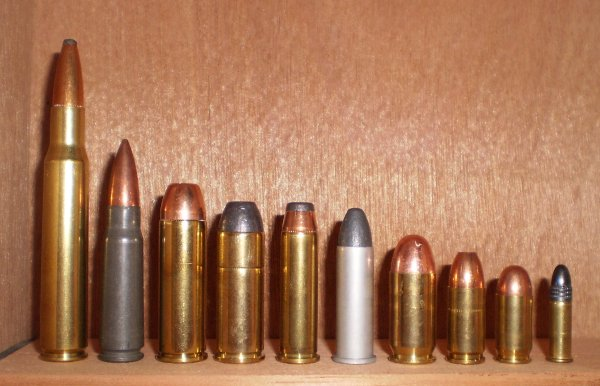
.45 Colt shown alongside other cartridges. From left to right: .30-06, 7.62×39mm, .454 Casull, .45 Colt, .357 Magnum, .38 Special, .45 ACP, 9×19mm Parabellum, .380 ACP, .22 Long Rifle

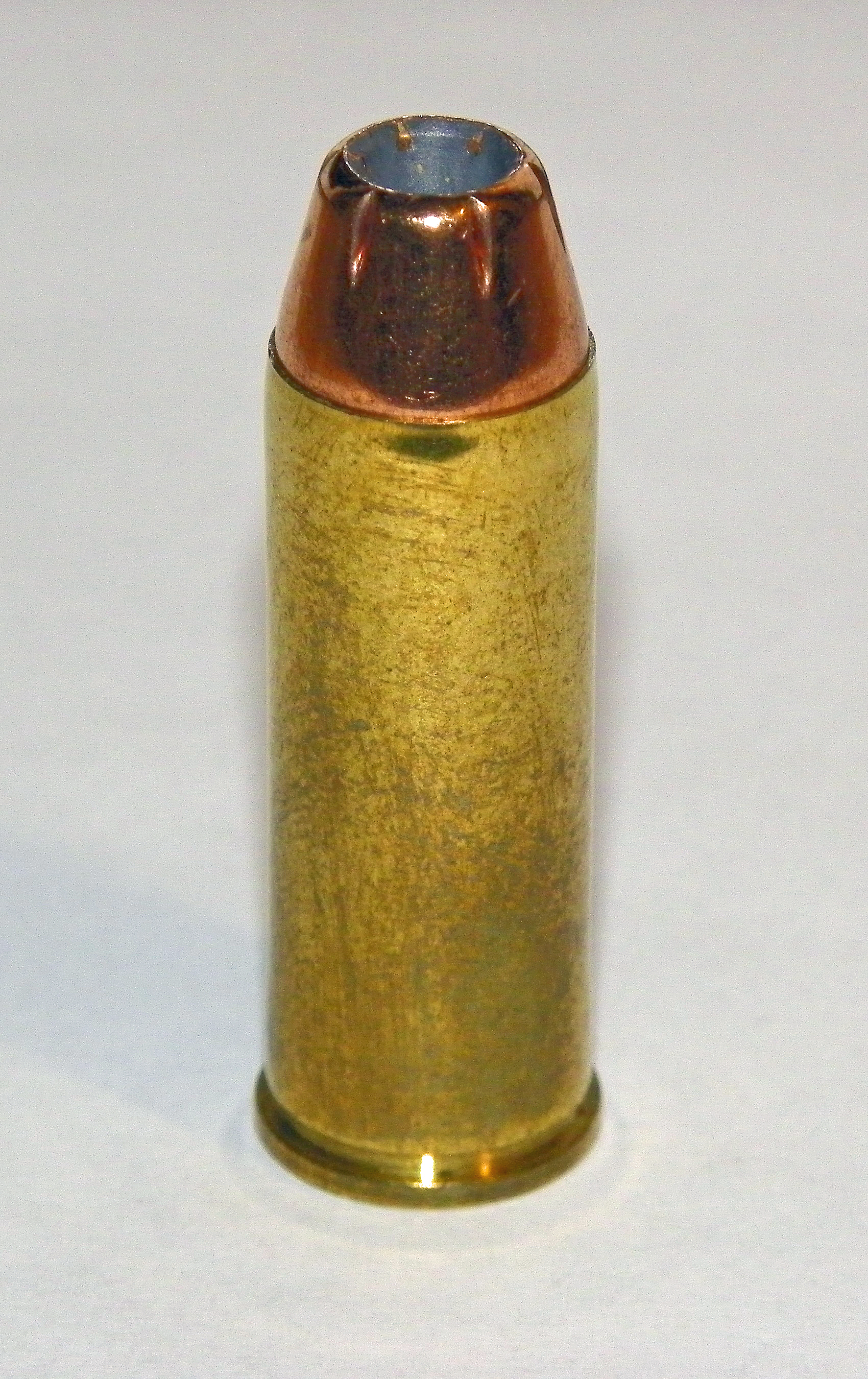
.45 Colt cartridge featuring a jacketed hollow point bullet

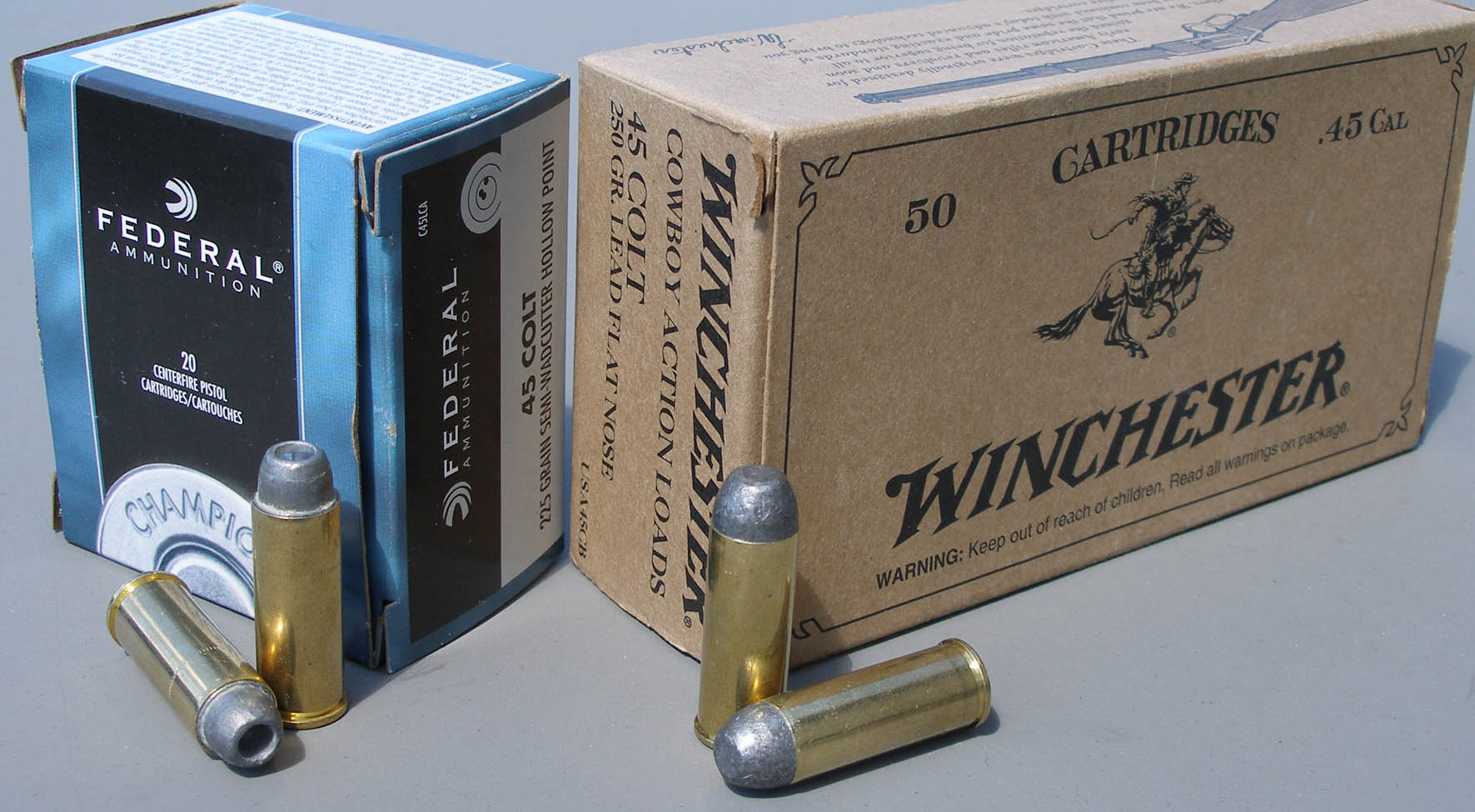
All-lead hollow point and flat nose .45 Colt cartridges

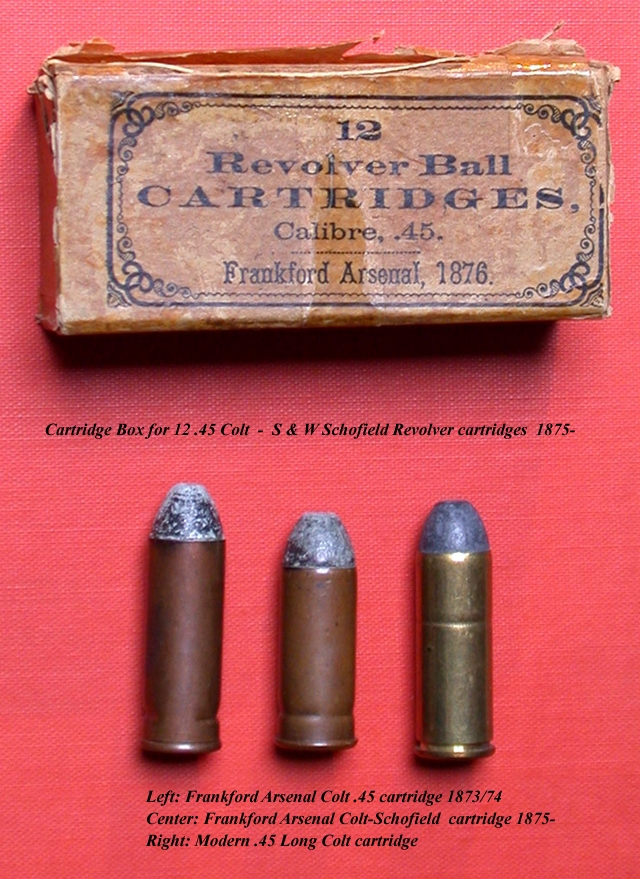
.45 Colt cartridges

== See also ==
- 11 mm caliber
- List of rimmed cartridges
- List of handgun cartridges
- Table of handgun and rifle cartridges
