= .45 Schofield =

Revolver cartridge designed by Smith & Wesson (S&W)

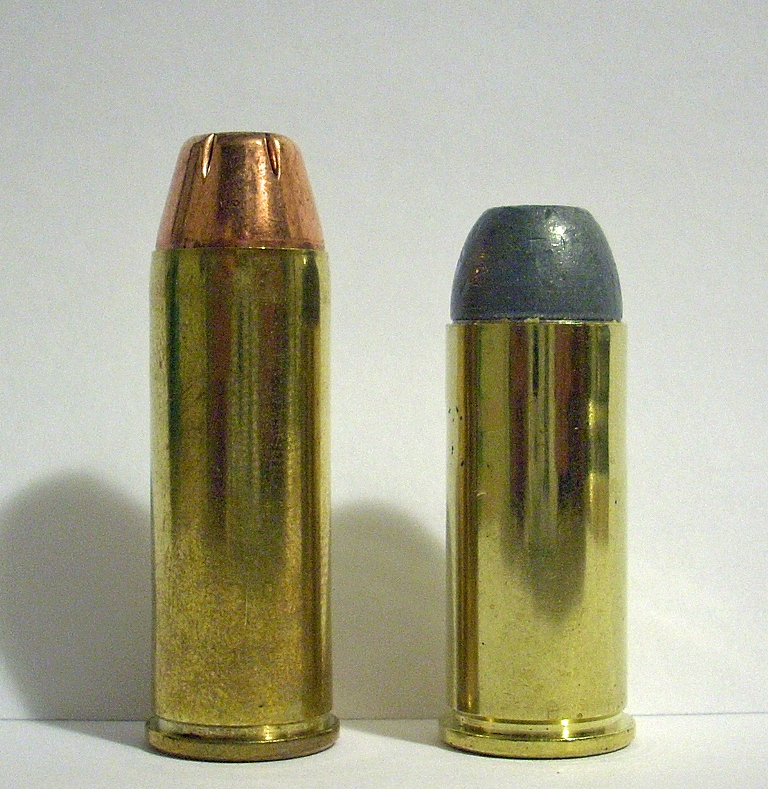
- .45 Colt (left) alongside the .45 Schofield cartridge
- Type: Revolver
- Place of origin: United States

Service history
- In service: 1875–1892
- Used by: US Army

Production history
- Designer: Smith & Wesson
- Designed: 1875
- Manufacturer: Smith & Wesson
- Produced: 1875–present

Specifications
- Case type: Rimmed, straight
- Bullet diameter: .454 in (11.5 mm)
- Neck diameter: .480 in (12.2 mm)
- Base diameter: .480 in (12.2 mm)
- Rim diameter: .520 in (13.2 mm)
- Rim thickness: .060 in (1.5 mm)
- Case length: 1.100 in (27.9 mm)
- Overall length: 1.430 in (36.3 mm)
- Rifling twist: 1 in 24"
- Primer type: Large pistol
- Maximum pressure (CIP): 14,500 psi (100 MPa)

Ballistic performance
Bullet mass/type	Velocity	Energy
200 gr (13 g) Lead SWC	859 ft/s (262 m/s)	328 ft⋅lbf (445 J)
230 gr (15 g) Lead (factory load)	730 ft/s (220 m/s)	276 ft⋅lbf (374 J)
250 gr (16 g) Lead	710 ft/s (220 m/s)	283 ft⋅lbf (384 J)
- Source: "Cartridges of the World" / Accurate Powder

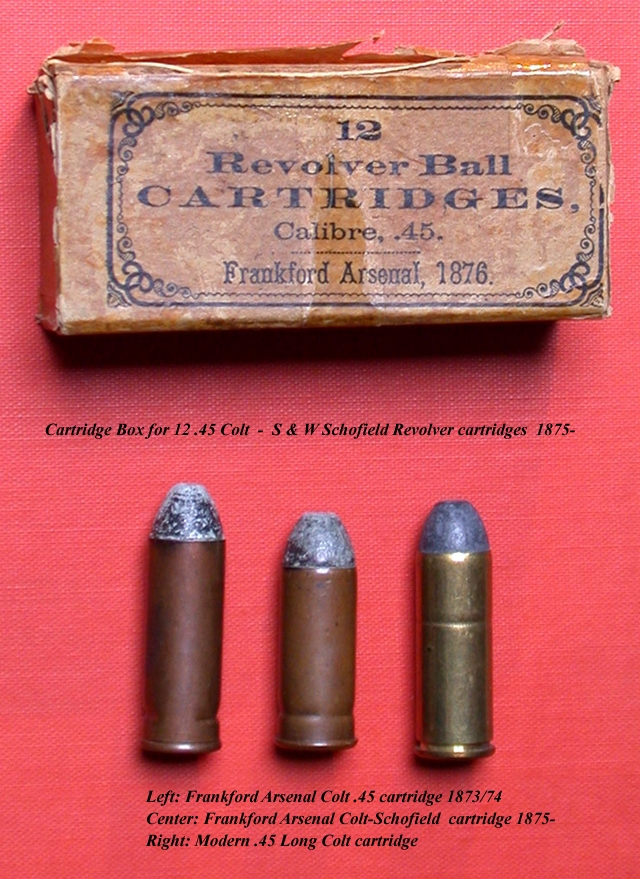
Early .45 Colt cartridges, in the center is the shorter cartridge for the S&W Schofield revolver with Benet primer

The .45 Schofield / 11.5x27mmR, also referred to as .45 Smith & Wesson is a revolver cartridge developed by Smith & Wesson for their S&W Model 3 Schofield top-break revolver. It is similar to the .45 Colt cartridge, but with a shorter case and a larger rim. The .45 Schofield will generally work in revolvers chambered for .45 Colt, but the reverse is not true due to the Colt round's longer case length. United States government arsenals supplied .45 Schofield cartridges for the Schofield revolver and the Colt Army revolver to help simplify their armament needs.

== History ==
This cartridge was originally designed as a black powder round. The Schofield revolver (a variant of the Smith & Wesson Model 3) was patented in the USA on 20 June 1871 and 22 April 1873 by Smith & Wesson. It was a Smith & Wesson Model 3 that was modified, due to a suggestion by Major George Schofield, to make it easier for a cavalryman to reload while riding. While the Colt 45 had more power, the speed at which a cavalryman could reload a Schofield was less than 30 seconds, half of the time for a Colt 45. By 1879, the U. S. Army had purchased 8,285 of the revolvers. Due to its reduced power and recoil compared to the Colt .45, it was easier to shoot accurately, yet still retained effective stopping power on the battlefield. It became the standard cartridge of the Army, though the Colt 1873 still was the main issue side arm of the Army.

The .45 Schofield cartridge was shorter than the .45 Colt. It could be used in both the Schofield and the Colt 45 Peacemaker, but the .45 Colt was too long to use in the Schofield. As a result, by the late 1880s the army finally standardized on a .45 cartridge designed to fire in both revolvers, the M1887 Military Ball Cartridge. The M1887 was made at Frankford Arsenal, and was issued only to the military. It had the shorter case of the Schofield and the reduced rim of the Colt round; as it was short enough to fit the Schofield, and its rim was not needed for the rod-ejector Single Action Army, the M1887 would fire and eject from both revolvers.

The Schofield was quite a popular handgun in the old west, and may have been used by General Custer at the Battle of the Little Bighorn. The effectiveness of the cartridge in battle, and its reputation for shootability and accuracy, led to the duplication of the cartridges' characteristics in the .45 ACP, which would be later chambered in Colt's M1911 pistol.

In the early 1880s the Benet type (internal) cartridge primer was retired and the modern Boxer type (external) primer was adopted for all future military production of revolver ammunition.

== Synonyms ==
- .45 S&W
- .45 S&W Schofield
- .45 M1877 ball revolver

== See also ==
- 11 mm caliber – Firearm cartridge classification
- List of rimmed cartridges
- List of cartridges by caliber
- List of handgun cartridges
