= Snubnosed revolver =

Type of gun

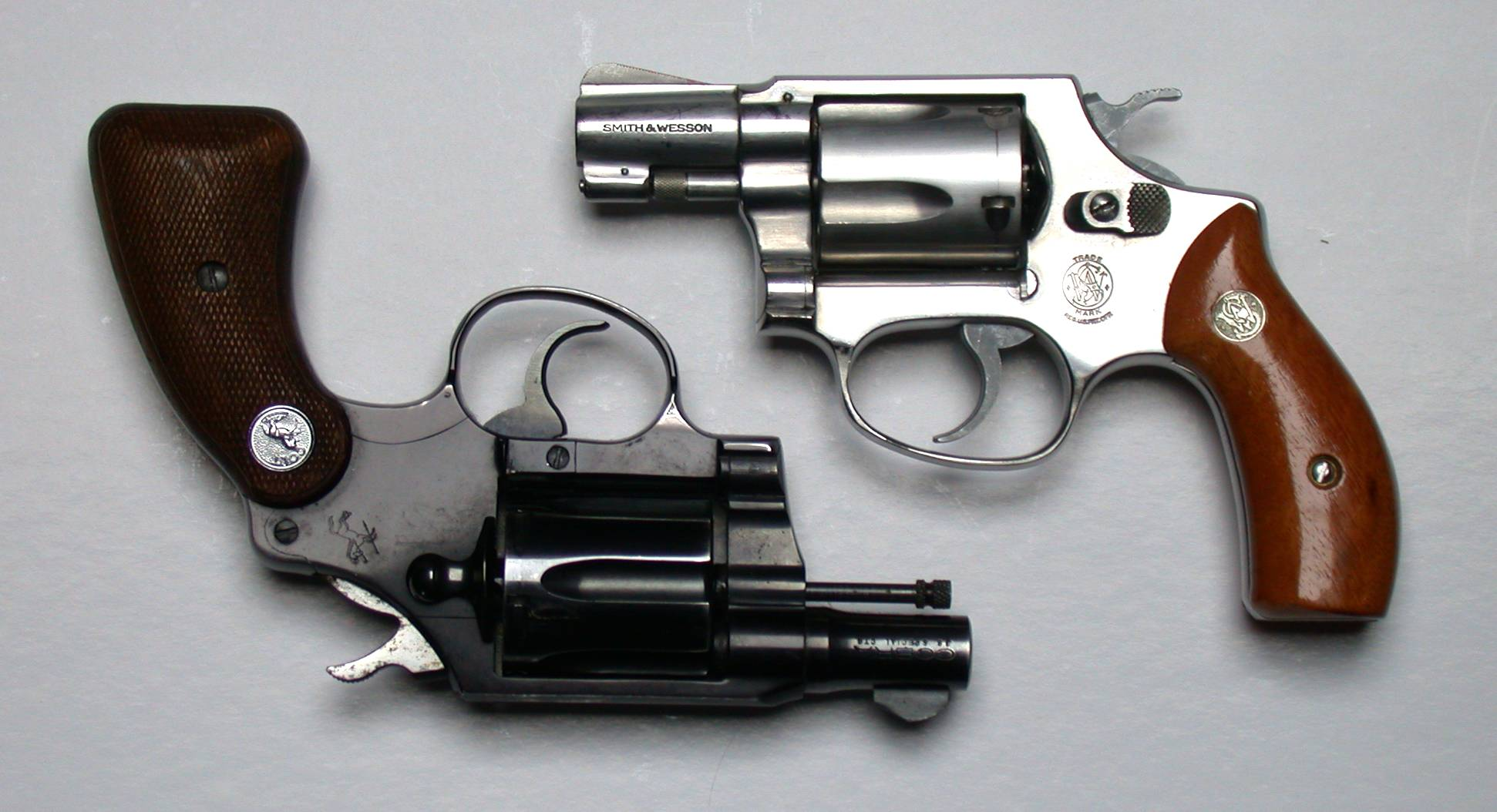
A Colt Cobra and a Smith & Wesson Model 36 snubnosed revolvers

A snubnosed revolver (colloquially known as a snubbie, belly gun, or bulldog revolver) is a small, medium, or large frame revolver with a short barrel, generally less than 3 inches (7.62 cm) in length. Smaller such revolvers are often made with "bobbed" or "shrouded" hammers and there are also "hammerless" models (where the hammer is entirely internal); the point is to allow the gun to be drawn with little risk of it snagging on clothing. Since the external movement of the mechanism is minimal or nil, shrouded and hammerless models may be fired from within clothing. The design of these revolvers compromises range and accuracy at a distance in favor of maneuverability and ease of carry and concealment.

Snubnosed revolvers were popular in the United States until the 1950s and 1960s when many states passed laws limiting or prohibiting the carrying of concealed weapons. The passage in many US states of "shall issue" firearms license laws from the mid-1980s to the 1990s created new markets for small, simple, reliable, concealed-carry firearms. This resulted in a resurgence in the popularity of snubnosed revolvers in the United States.

Demand for snubnosed revolvers has been met with the introduction of numerous new models from Smith & Wesson, Colt, Ruger, Taurus, and other manufacturers. While most are made of traditional carbon steel, stainless steel, and lightweight aluminum alloys that have been in use for decades, some models use high-strength, lightweight metal alloys such as titanium and scandium. Polymer frames have also been used.

Most firearms manufacturers now produce snubnosed revolvers in larger calibers than before, including .357 Magnum, .41 Magnum, .44 Magnum, and .45 Colt. Some companies make .454 Casull, .460 S&W Magnum, .480 Ruger, .500 S&W Magnum, and .410 bore snubnosed revolvers. There are also snubnosed revolvers chambered for semi-automatic pistol cartridges such as 9×19mm Parabellum, .40 S&W, and .45 ACP (loaded with the aid of Moon clips).

== History ==
The first commercial snubnosed revolver was the six-shot, 3 in (76 mm) barreled Colt Single Action Army revolver, made without an ejector rod. It was officially called the "Sheriff's Model," or the "Storekeeper's Model", also unofficially known as the "Banker's Special". The 4 3/4 in (120 mm) barrel models were known as the "Gunfighter" model. The 5 1/2 in (140 mm) barrel models were called the "Artillery", and the "Cattleman" or "Cowboy" models. And 7 1/2 in (190 mm) barrel models were called the "Army", the "Cavalry" and the "Standard" models.

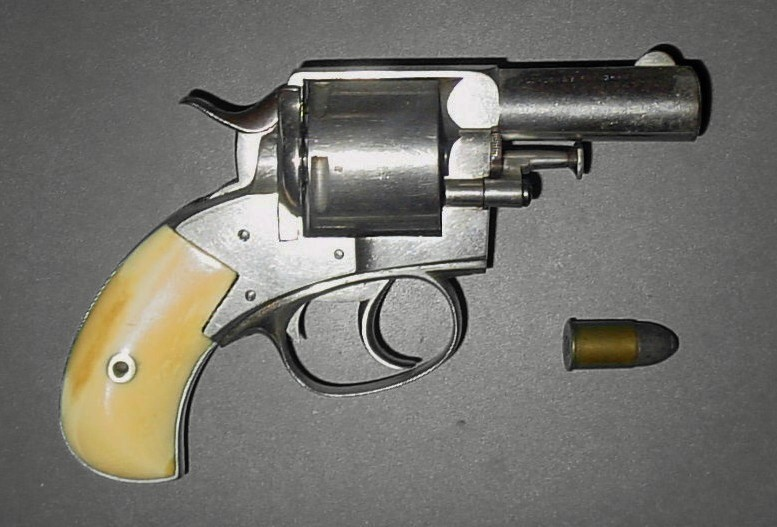
Webley .450 "British Bull Dog" model - 1870s

The British Bull Dog revolver was a popular type of 5-shot, solid-frame, double action, pocket revolver introduced by Philip Webley & Son of Birmingham, England, in 1872, and subsequently copied by gunmakers in continental Europe and the United States. It featured a 2 1/2 in (64 mm) barrel and was chambered for .442 Webley or .450 Adams cartridges. Webley produced smaller scaled .320 Revolver and .380 caliber versions later, but did not mark them with the British Bull Dog name. The term "bulldog revolver" became synonymous with large-caliber "snubnosed revolvers".

The Colt M1877 Double Action Revolver is a 6-shot, double-action revolver manufactured by Colt from January 1877 to 1909, a total of 166,849 revolvers. The Model 1877 was offered in three calibers, with three unofficial names: .32 Long Colt ("Rainmaker"), .38 Long Colt ("Lightning"), and .41 Long Colt ("Thunderer"). The M1877 was the first successful US-made double-action cartridge revolver. The M1877 was offered from the factory in two basic finishes: nickel-plated or a case-hardened frame with a blue barrel and cylinder. The revolver was available in 2 1/2 in (64 mm) and 3 1/2 in (89 mm) barrel lengths and was available with or without the ejector rod and housing. The shorter barreled versions without the ejector rod were marketed as "Shopkeeper's Special".

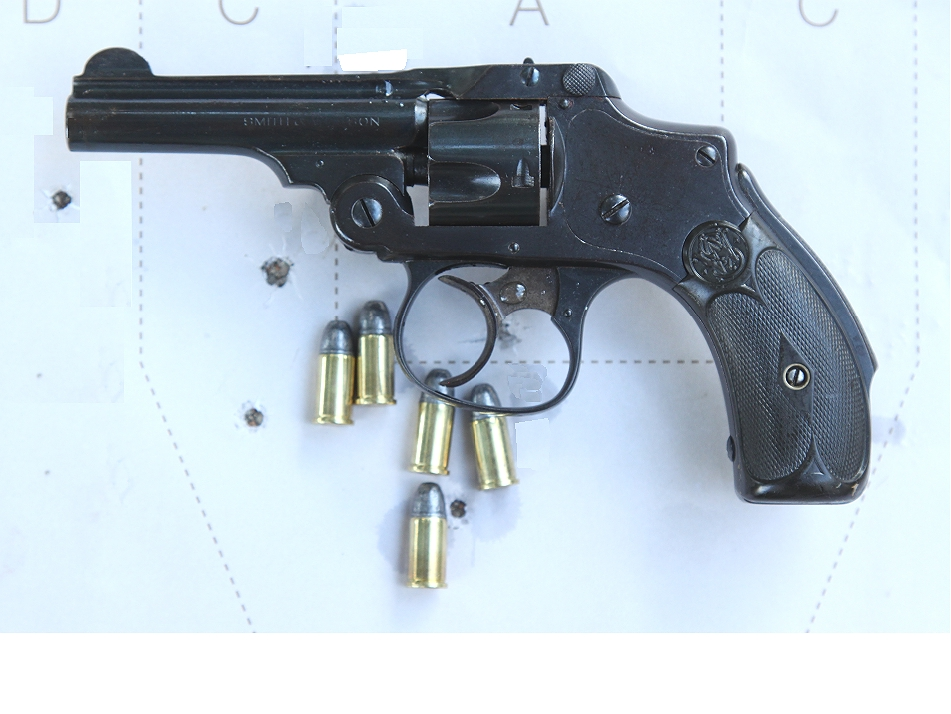
.32 caliber Smith & Wesson Safety Hammerless

The Smith & Wesson Safety Hammerless model was produced from 1887 to World War II. It is a small, concealable, 5-shot, double-action revolver chambered in either .32 S&W or .38 S&W. They were most often produced with 2 in (51 mm), 3 in (76 mm) and 3.5 in (89 mm) barrels. These top-break revolvers were designed for fast reloading and concealed carry as the hammer was internal and would not snag on drawing the revolver from a pocket. The gun also had a grip safety. This design was known as "The New Departure" to reflect the company's new approach to designing revolvers. The design of these revolvers sacrifices accuracy and range in favor of maneuverability and concealment. Similar "hammerless" designs were made by manufacturers such as Iver Johnson and Harrington & Richardson and proved popular for concealed carry.

The FitzGerald Special, "Fitz Special", or "Fitz Colt" is a snubnosed revolver concept that was designed by John Henry Fitzgerald (AKA: "Fitz"), an employee of Colt's Manufacturing Company from 1918 to 1944. Fitz Special revolvers are made by shortening the barrel to two inches, shortening the ejector rod, bobbing the hammer spur, removing the front half of the trigger guard, and rounding the butt. Reshaping the hammer and the butt allowed the gun to be drawn quickly with little risk of snagging on clothing. The halved trigger guard facilitates quick trigger acquisition, even for shooters with large fingers or gloves. Fitzgerald first came up with his concept sometime around the mid-1920s when he modified a .38 Special Colt Police Positive Special revolver, whose shortest available barrel length at the time was four inches. He later modified two .45 caliber Colt New Service revolvers in the same manner, and was known to carry the pair in his front pockets. The FitzGerald Special was the precursor of the modern snubnosed revolver and specifically was the prototype for the Colt Detective Special.

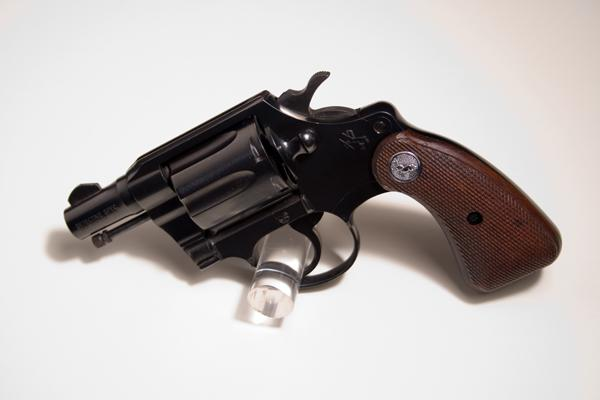
Colt Detective Special

The Colt Detective Special is a carbon steel framed double-action, snubnosed, six-shot revolver. As the name "Detective Special" suggests, this model revolver was used as a concealed weapon by plainclothes police detectives. It was made with either a 2 in (51 mm) or a 3 in (76 mm) barrel. Introduced in 1927, the Detective Special was the first snubnosed revolver produced with a modern swing-out frame. It was designed from the outset to be chambered for higher-powered cartridges such as the .38 Special, considered to be a powerful caliber for a concealable pocket pistols of the day.

The Smith & Wesson Model 10 or Military & Police is a revolver of worldwide popularity. In production since 1899, it is a medium-sized, 6-shot, .38 Special, double-action revolver with fixed sights. Over its long production run it has been available with barrel lengths of 4 in (100 mm), 5 in (130 mm), and 6 in (150 mm). With the first snubnosed models with barrel lengths of 2 in (51 mm), 2.5 in (64 mm), and 3 in (76 mm) being made in 1936. Over 6,000,000 Model 10s have been produced over the years, making it the most popular handgun of the 20th century.

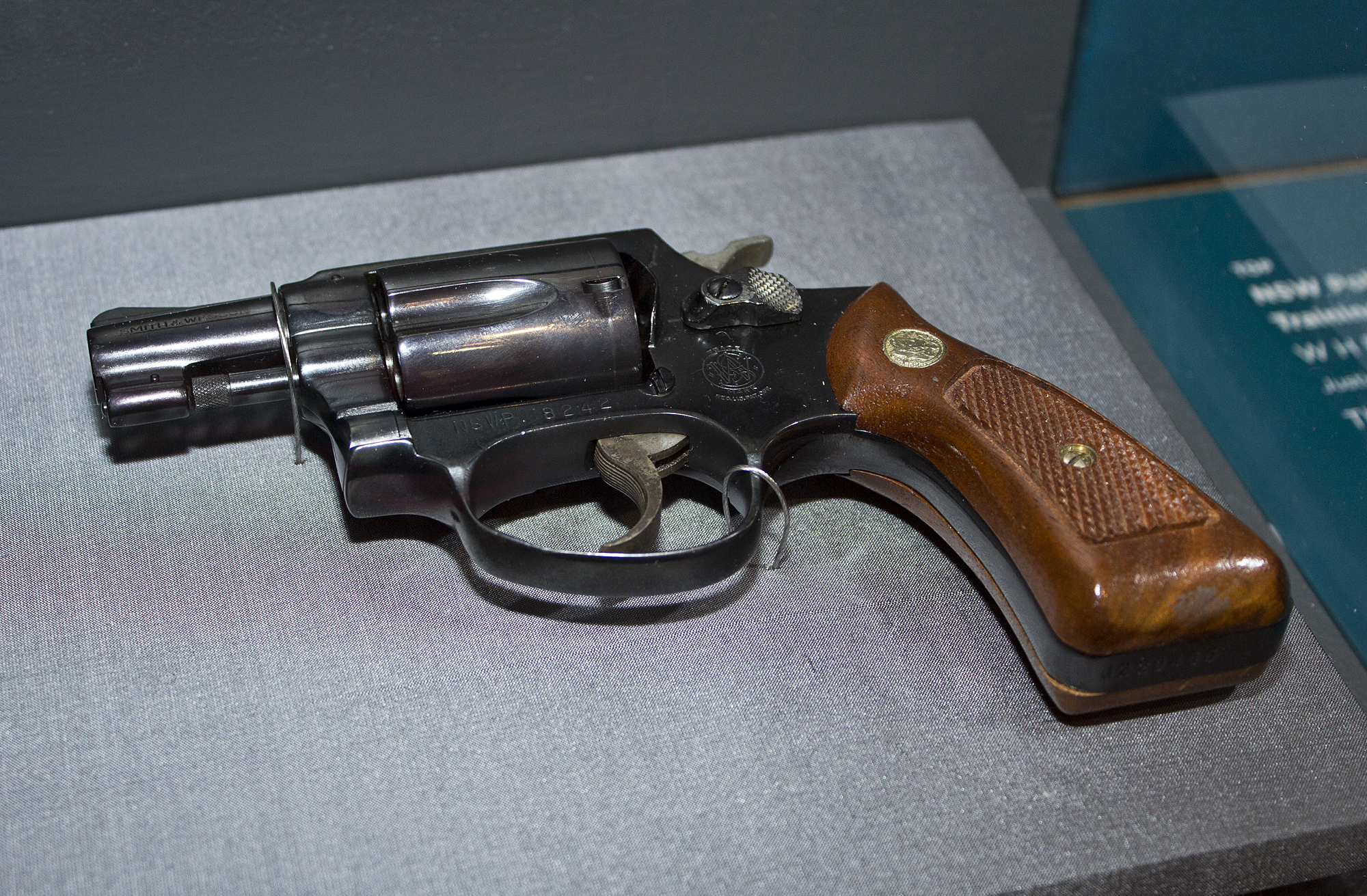
Smith & Wesson Model 36

The Smith & Wesson Model 36 was designed in the era just after World War II when Smith & Wesson stopped producing war materials and resumed normal production. For the Model 36, they designed a small concealable, 5-shot, double-action revolver with a 2 in (51 mm) barrel, that could fire the more powerful .38 Special cartridge. Since the older "Safety Hammerless" (I-frame) was not able to handle this load, a new frame was designed, which became the J-frame.

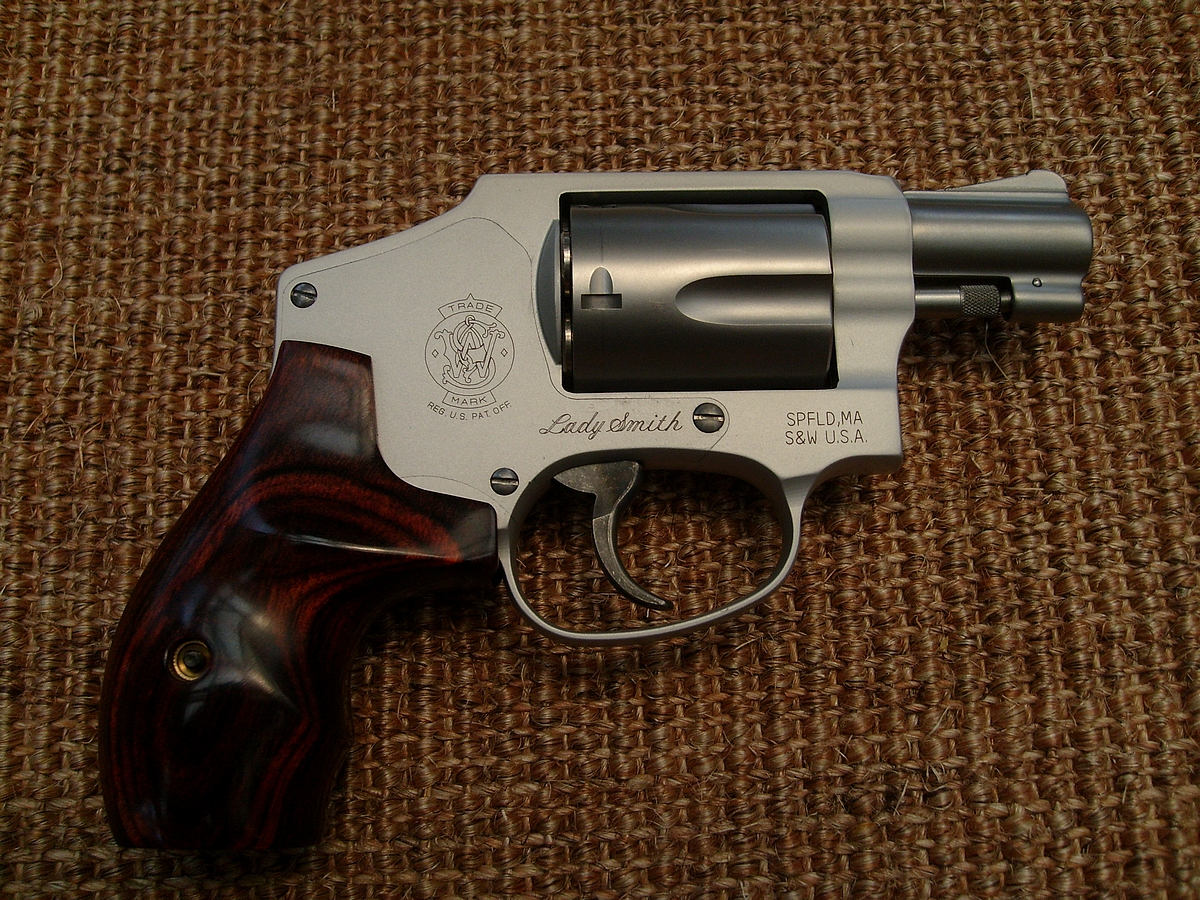
Smith & Wesson Model 642 Ladysmith "hammerless" revolver

The new design was introduced at the International Association of Chiefs of Police (IACP) convention in 1950 and was favorably received. A vote was held to name the new revolver, and the name "Chiefs Special" won. A 3 in (76 mm) barreled version design went into production immediately, due to high demand. It was available in either a blued or nickel-plated finish. It was produced as the "Chiefs Special" until 1957 when it then became the Model 36. In 1951, Smith & Wesson introduced the Airweight Model 37, which was basically the Model 36 design with an aluminum frame and cylinder. The aluminum cylinders proved to be problematic and were abandoned in favor of a steel cylinder. Smith & Wesson also introduced the J-frame Smith & Wesson Centennial (hammerless) models and Smith & Wesson Bodyguard (shrouded hammer) models. In the 1990s, S&W introduced 9mm Parabellum and .357 Magnum models. They also introduced new models using high-strength, lightweight metal alloys such as titanium and scandium.

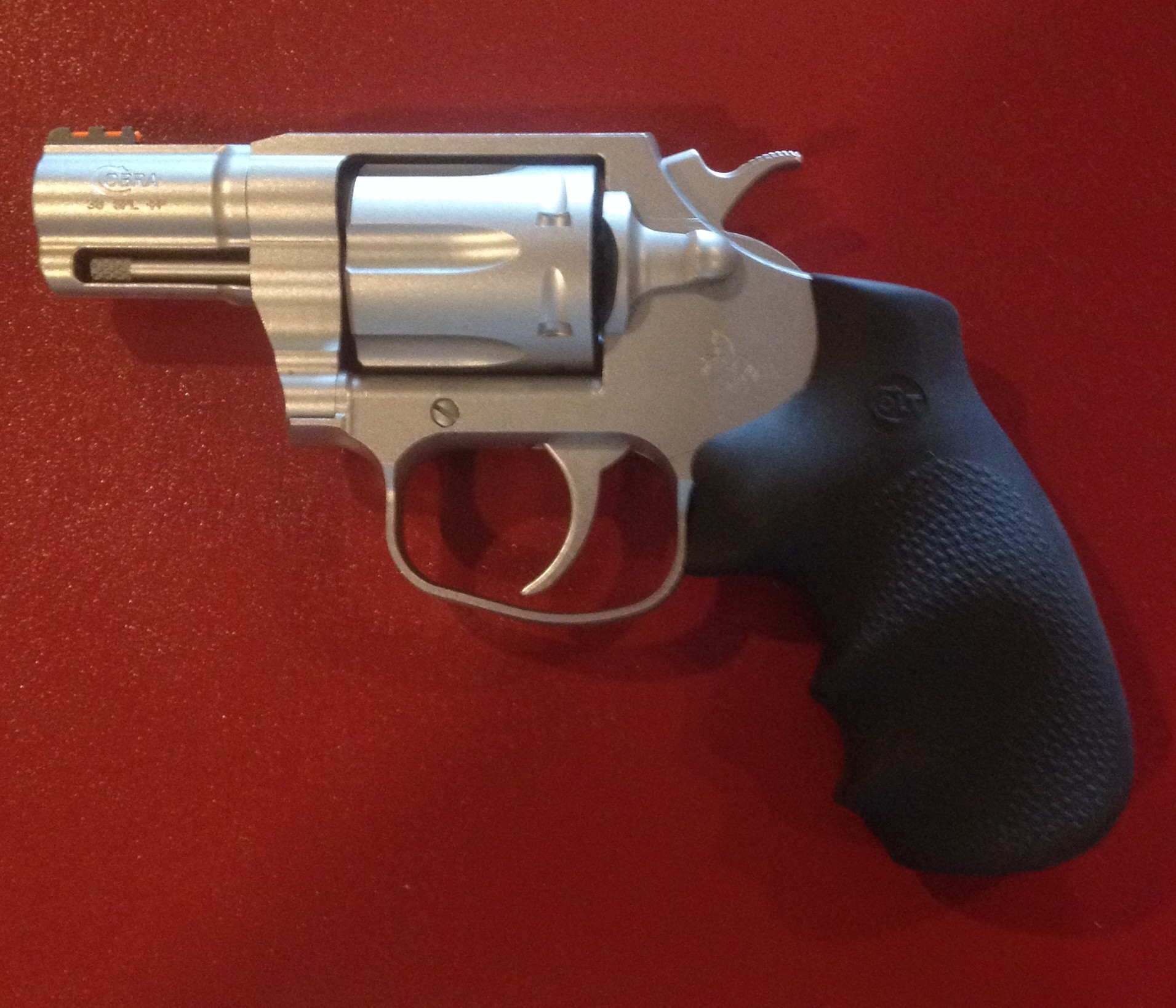
Colt Cobra

The Colt Cobra is a lightweight, 21 oz aluminum-framed, 6-shot, double-action revolver most commonly produced with a 2 in (51 mm) barrel, not to be confused with the Colt King Cobra. The Cobra is chambered for .38 Special, .38 S&W, .32 S&W Long, and .22 LR. It was sold by Colt from 1950 until 1981. In December 2016, it was announced that Colt would be producing a new run of the Colt Cobra with a steel frame and a fiber optic front sight. This model was released in early 2017.

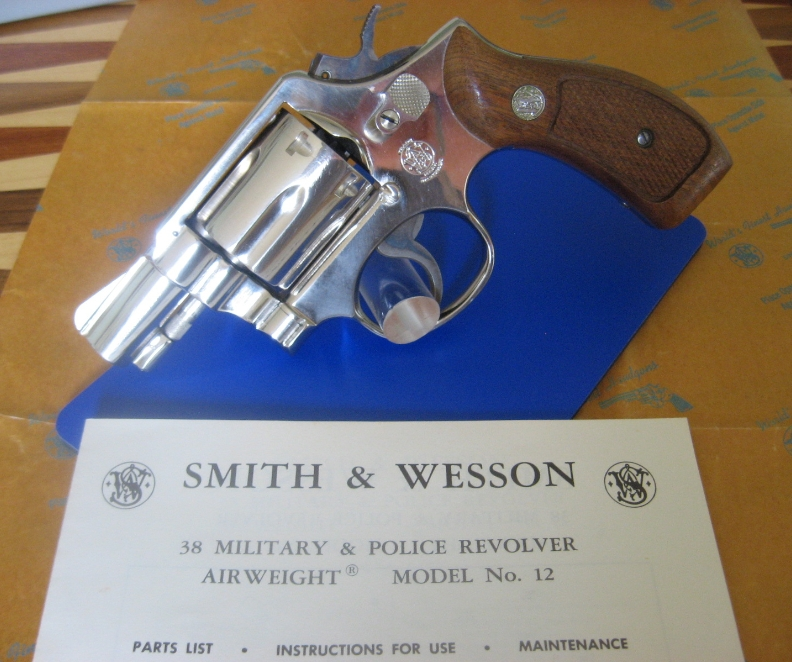
Smith & Wesson Model 12-2

The Smith & Wesson Model 12 is an aluminum alloy-frame version of the Model 10. It weighs 19 oz (524 g) unloaded. A 6-shot, .38 Special revolver was made from 1953 to 1986 in both 2 in (51 mm) and 4 in (100 mm) barrel configurations. The Model 12 was Smith & Wesson's answer to the Colt Cobra. Early models used an aluminum cylinder as well as the frame. [The Colt version was the Colt M13 Aircrewman 1951-1957.]

Introduced in the early 1970s, the Model 15-2 became the best-selling Dan Wesson Firearms revolver model to go into production. This 6-shot, .357 Magnum revolver uses a unique interchangeable barrel system, including a 2.5 in (64 mm) snub nose barrel along with 4 in (100 mm), 6 in (150 mm), 8 in (200 mm), 10 in (250 mm), 12 in (300 mm), and 15 in (380 mm), partial or fully-lugged shrouds with choices of solid or ventilated ribs, plus removable and interchangeable front sights. The Model 15-2 could be ordered as "Pistol Pacs" with 4 (or more) barrel/shroud sets shipped inside a fiberglass briefcase with barrel changing tool and clearance gauges; however, most pistols were sold with only one barrel, with the buyers able to purchase other barrels later. All barrels and shrouds within a model series are compatible, thus a Model 15-2 frame from the 1970s may be equipped with a barrel from the 1990s and a shroud made in 2016. The 15-2 increased sales markedly over the earlier models and were often seen in use with both target shooters and hunters. Model 44s are large-frame models in .44 Magnum with interchangeable barrels, including a 2.5 in (64 mm) snubnose barrel.

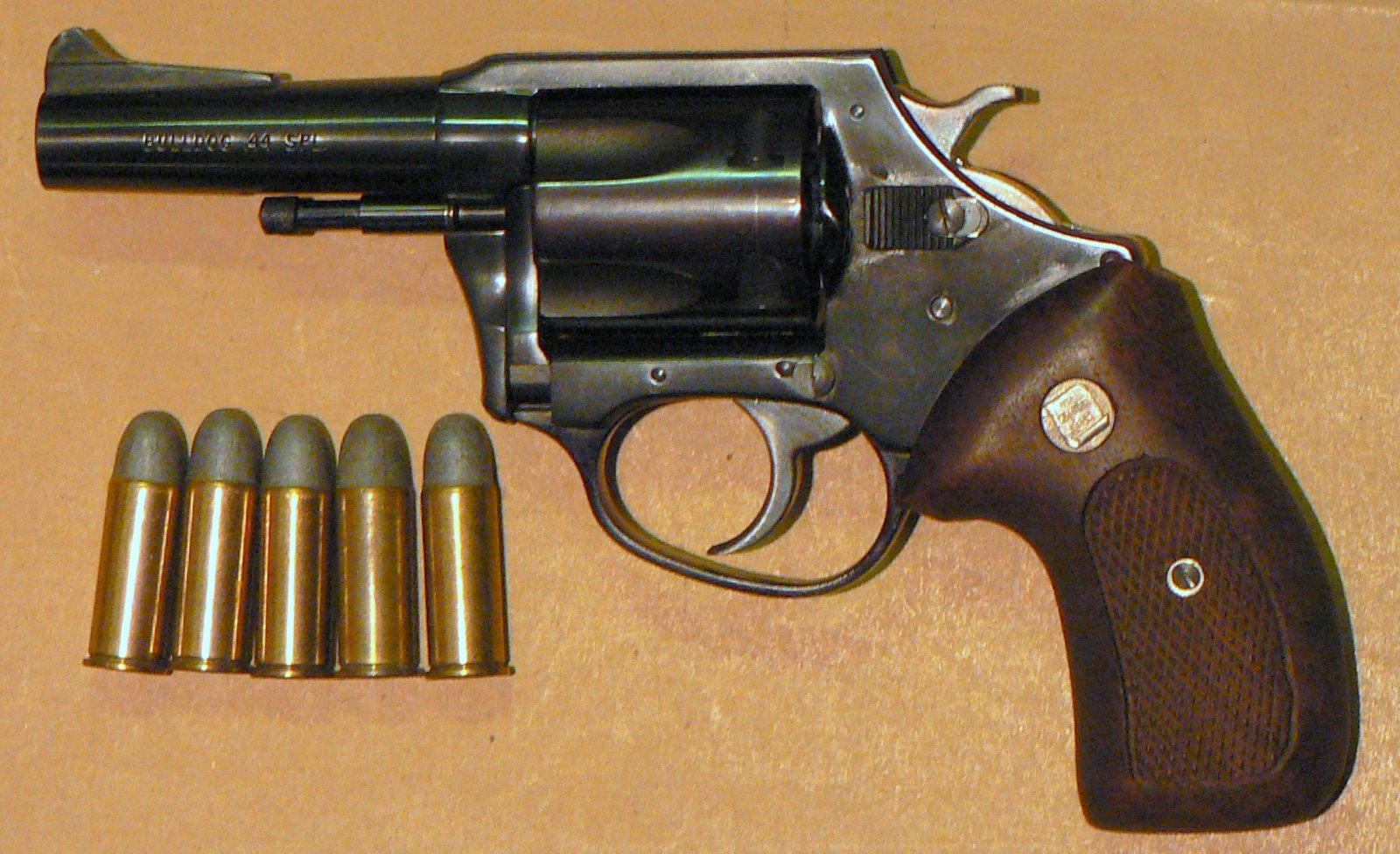
Charter Arms Bulldog .44 Special with 5 rounds

Introduced in 1973, the Charter Arms Bulldog is a 5-shot, .44 Special or .45 Colt snubnosed revolver. It was a top-selling gun during the 1980s and is considered the company's trademark weapon. The Bulldog comes in multiple barrel lengths including 2.2 in (56 mm), 2.5 in (64 mm) and 3 in (76 mm). It has no sharp edges to contend with when carrying the weapon in a holster or a pocket. The Bulldog is a solid-framed traditional double-action revolver, the cylinder is opened by pushing a release slide on the left of the gun, or in the original model by pulling the ejector rod. It features a concave sight. Its trigger pull, in both single and double-action modes, is quite light. The Police Undercover model comes in .357 Magnum, while the Pittbull models come in .45 ACP, .40 S&W, and 9×19mm Luger. Charter Arms also makes a variety of smaller-frame .38 Special snubnosed models known as the Undercover offered in standard, bobbed, shrouded, and hammerless models. Charter also produces the Mag Pug in .357 Magnum and .41 Remington Magnum.

The Taurus Model 85 is a small-frame, 5-shot, double-action revolver manufactured by the Brazilian firearm company Taurus International. Introduced in the 1980s, in the United States the guns are marketed for concealed carry and personal protection. The Model 85 is available with either 2 in (51 mm) or 3 in (76 mm) barrels, is capable of firing +P rated .38 Special rounds. The Model 85 is available in several configurations. These include blued steel, stainless steel, polymer frame, and "Ultra-Lite" variants constructed of aluminum and titanium, with steel lock-work components.

Much like Smith & Wesson revolvers, Model 85s can come equipped as exposed, bobbed, shrouded, and hammerless models. However, there are a number of significant internal differences between the Taurus 85 and similar Smith & Wesson revolvers. Because of these differences, Taurus has been able to keep costs relatively low. However, those same differences can make customization of the Model 85 more expensive. Taurus also makes a more powerful versions such as the Model 605 in .357 Magnum and the 9mm Parabellum Model 905.

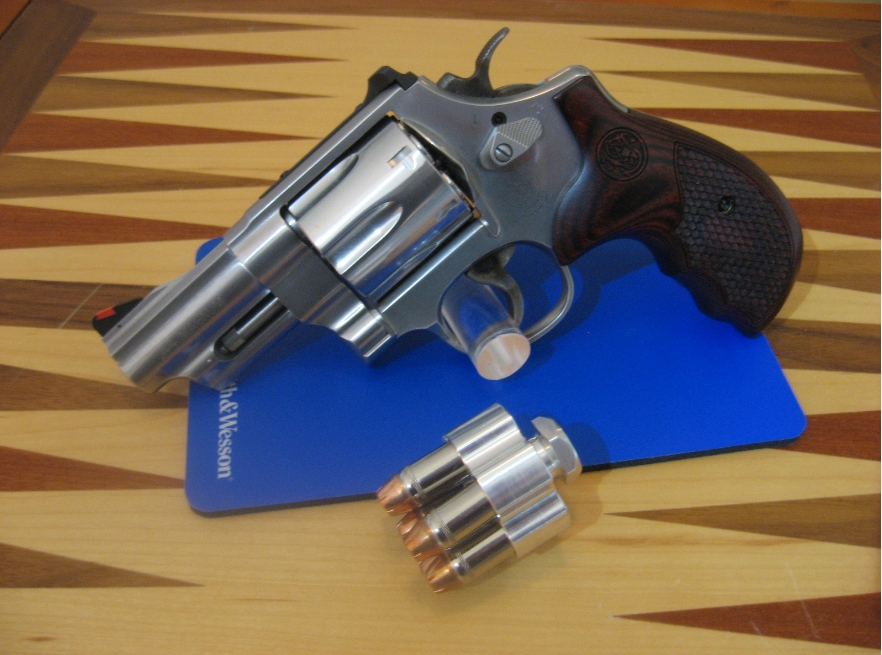
Three-inch snubnosed .44 Magnum S&W Model 629-6 Deluxe Talo Edition

In 1989, Smith & Wesson began to make a series of snubnosed models of the S&W Model 29, a large frame, six-shot, double-action revolver chambered for the .44 Magnum cartridge. The Backpacker with a 2.5 in (64 mm) barrel, and the Mountain Gun and the Trail Boss had 3 in (76 mm) barrels. These guns were designed to be "carried often and shot little".

The Ruger SP101 is a series of small-frame, double-action revolvers introduced in 1989 by the American company Sturm, Ruger as the smaller-frame counterpart to the GP100.. The SP101 is an all-steel-construction revolver with a spurred or spurless (double-action only) hammer. The SP-101 has barrel lengths of 2 1/4 in (57 mm) and 3 1/16 in (78 mm). The .38 Special, .357 Magnum, and 9×19mm Parabellum models hold 5-shots, while the .327 Federal Magnum and .32 H&R Magnum models hold 6-shots, and .22 LR model holds 8 shots.

The Smith & Wesson Model 500 Emergency Survival is a large frame, 5-shot, 2.75 in (70 mm) barrel, .500 S&W Magnum, double action revolver with blaze orange Hogue grips. The Model 500 was built on the entirely new X-Frame, which was developed exclusively to handle the muzzle velocity and pressures generated by firing the .500 Magnum cartridge. It is among the most powerful revolvers in the world since its original release in 2003, and is marketed as "the world's most powerful handgun" by the manufacturer. The Smith & Wesson Model 460 Emergency Survival is essentially the same gun in .460 S&W Magnum. It can also shoot .454 Casull and .45 Colt, and is easily identified by its neon yellow Hogue grips.

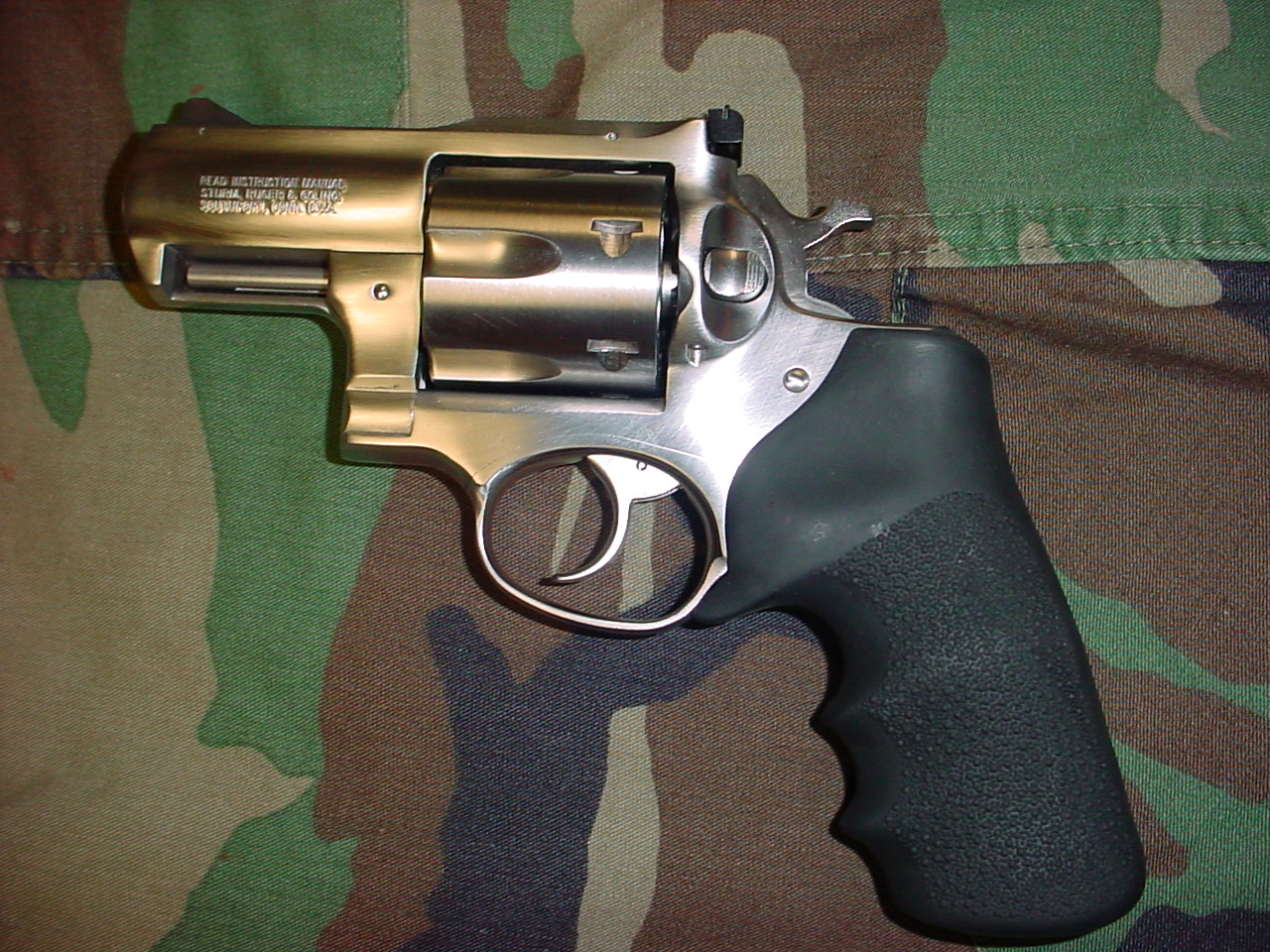
A Ruger Redhawk Alaskan chambered in .44 Magnum

Introduced in 2005, the Ruger Alaskan is Ruger's first short-barreled, big-bore, six-shot, double-action revolver, intended for defense against large, dangerous animals. The 2.5 in (64 mm) barrel on the Alaskan ends at the end of the frame, and the scope bases are omitted. The interchangeable front sight is replaced with a pinned-in ramp sight, but the adjustable rear sight is retained. The Alaskan is available in .44 Magnum, .454 Casull/.45 Colt, and .480 Ruger, with the .480 model originally a 6-shot, replaced in 2008 with a 5-shot model to aid in spent cartridge extraction. All Alaskans feature a brushed stainless finish and a Hogue Tamer rubber finger groove grip, rather than the standard GP100 style. The .454 and .480 versions have an unfluted cylinder while the .44 Magnum features a fluted cylinder.

The Ruger LCR is a small, 5-shot, double-action revolver with a 1.875 in (47.6 mm) barrel, built by Ruger and announced in January 2009. LCR stands for 'Lightweight Compact Revolver'. It incorporates several novel features such as a polymer grip and trigger housing, monolithic receiver, and constant force trigger. At 13.5 oz (380 g), the LCR is nearly 50% lighter than the stainless steel SP101 and only the barrel and fluted cylinder are made of stainless steel. The frame is aluminum alloy and synthetic glass-filled polymer finished in matte black with Synergistic Hard Coat. The LCR operates in double-action only (DAO) as the hammer is concealed within the frame handle's fire control housing and cannot be cocked prior to firing. In order to create a lighter trigger pull, it features a friction-reducing cam. The LCR-357 chambered for .357 Magnum. The Ruger LCR 22 an 8-shot .22 LR version. There are also a 6-shot .22 Winchester Magnum Rimfire and a .327 Federal Magnum versions, as well as 5-shot a clip-fed 9mm Luger version.

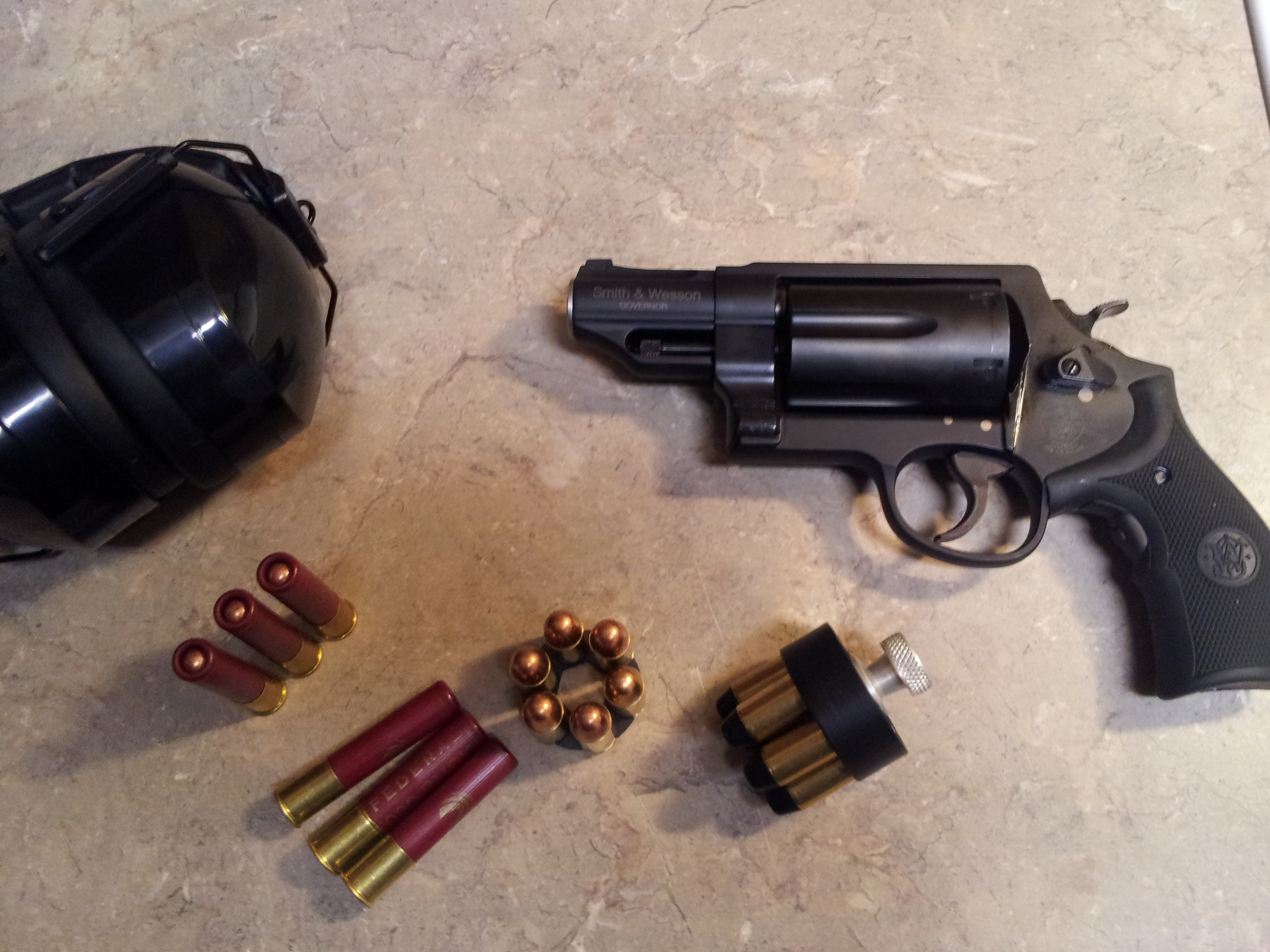
Smith & Wesson Governor Smith & Wesson Governor revolver, with a speedloader, loaded with 45 Colt, a moon clip loaded with 45 ACP, and six Federal 2-1/2 inch '000' buckshot shells, as well as hearing protection

The Taurus Judge is a 5-shot, snubnosed (3-inch barrel), revolver introduced in 2006, by Taurus International, chambered for .410 bore shot shells and the .45 Colt cartridge. Taurus promotes the Judge as a self-defense tool against carjacking and for home protection.

The Smith & Wesson Governor is a 6-shot, snubnosed (2.75-inch barrel), double-action revolver built on the Z-frame (a stretched N-frame) and utilizes a K-frame grip with a lightweight scandium alloy or stainless steel frame. Introduced in 2011, and similar to the Taurus Judge, the Governor can also fire 2 1/2-inch .410 shotgun shells, .45 Colt, and .45 ACP (with the use of supplied moon clips due to the lack of a rim on the auto pistol cartridges).

== Accessories ==
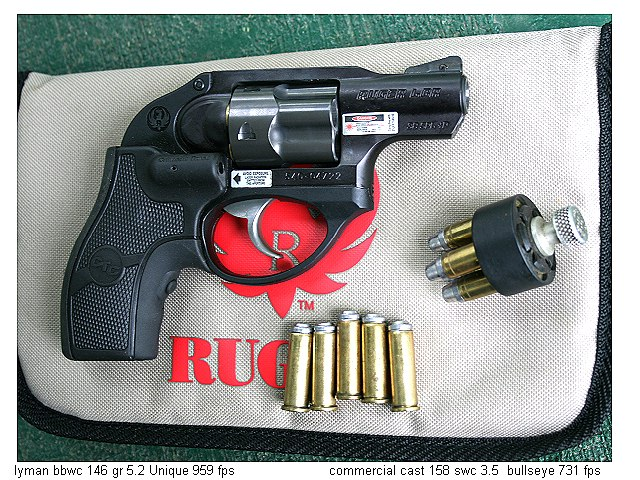
Ruger LCR .38 Special with Crimson Trace laser grip.

There is a range of aftermarket accessories available for the snubnosed revolvers, including grips, speedloaders, and holsters. There are also hammer shrouds and hammer shroud grips (Bianchi Lightning Grip) that convert standard exposed hammer revolvers to "bodyguard" models. The Pocket-Safe Hammer Shroud is a pop-on plastic device that covers the hammer, keeping it from snagging on clothing, and pops off when the trigger is pulled. There is a wide range of lasers available, with the Crimson Trace laser grips standing out among them. The Barami Hip-Grip is a "set of grips for revolvers with a paddle or wing added on the right-hand side. The wing hooks onto your belt and keeps the snubbie where you put it."

== See also ==
- Mini-revolver, a series of revolvers by the company North American Arms
- Pocket pistol
