= Colt New Service =

Colt New Service revolver
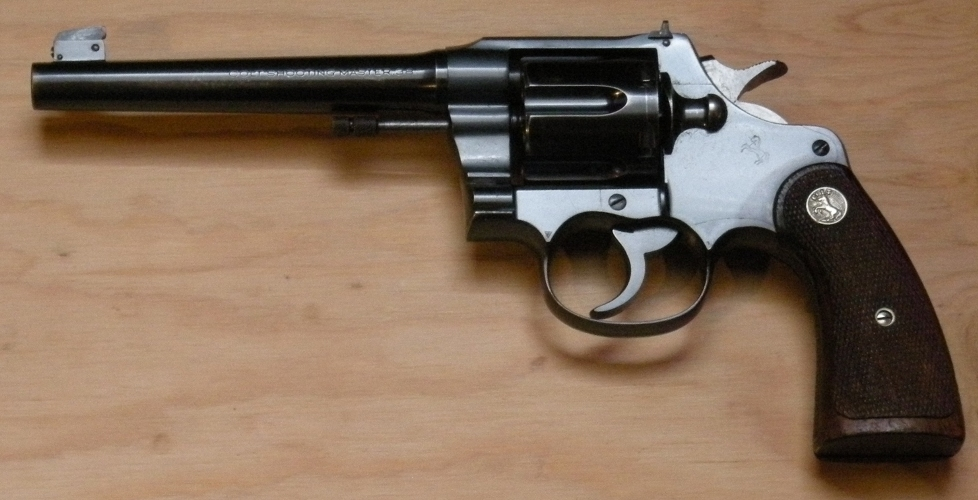
- Colt New Service "Shooting Master"
- Type: Revolver
- Place of origin: United States

Service history
- In service: 1898–1960s
- Used by: United States; United Kingdom; Canada; Commonwealth of the Philippines; Royal Canadian Mounted Police
- Wars: Spanish–American War; Philippine–American War; Boxer Rebellion; Second Boer War; World War I; World War II; Korean War; Vietnam War (limited)

Production history
- Manufacturer: Colt's Patent Firearms Manufacturing Co.
- Produced: 1898–1946
- No. built: 356,000+

Specifications
- Cartridge: .38-40, .44 Russian, .44 Special, .44-40, .45 Colt, .455 Webley, and later .45 ACP, .38 Special, .357 Magnum as well as other less common calibers.
- Action: Double-action revolver
- Feed system: 6-round cylinder
- Sights: Fixed blade front, notch rear

The Colt New Service is a large frame, large caliber, double-action revolver made by Colt from 1898 until 1941. Made in various calibers, the .45 Colt version with a 5 1/2-inch (140 mm) barrel was adopted by the U.S. Armed Forces as the Model 1909.

The Colt M1917 revolver was created to supplement insufficient stocks of M1911 pistols during World War I. It was simply a New Service re-chambered to take the .45 ACP cartridge and used half-moon clips to hold the rimless cartridges in position. After World War I, the revolver gained a strong following among civilian shooters. A commercial rimmed cartridge the .45 Auto Rim was also developed, that allowed the M1917 to be fired without the need for moon-clips.

In the 1930s, the New Service was chambered for .38 Special, and then .357 Magnum. As one of the most powerful handgun cartridges available at the time, it was easily capable of penetrating the automobile bodies and body armor used by public enemies such as gangsters, bank robbers, and fugitives of that era. As such, it became instantly popular with lawmen, state troopers and highway patrolmen.

== History ==
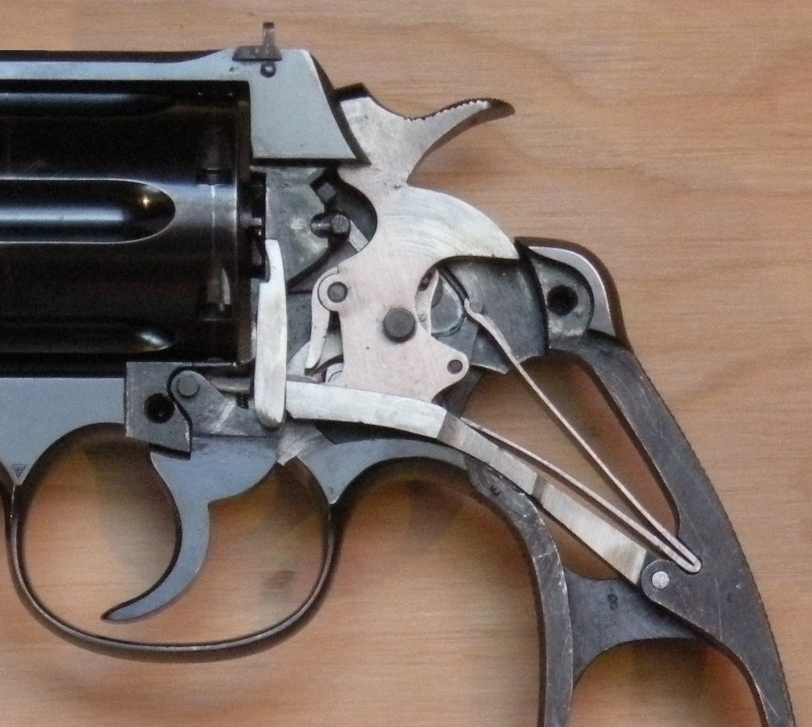
New Service Revolver, lock

The Colt New Service was introduced in 1898. It was an up-sized and strengthened Colt M1892 and Colt Firearms first large caliber revolver with a swing-out hand ejector cylinder. It was made in the popular large caliber revolver cartridges of the day: .38-40, .44-40, .44 Russian, .44 Special, .45 Colt, .450 Boxer, .455 Webley, and .476 Enfield. It was made with a blued finish or nickel plating, and with barrel lengths of 4, 4 1/2, 5, 5 1/2, 6 and 7 1/2 inches (100, 110, 130, 140, 150 and 190 mm). It also came with walnut or hard rubber grips.

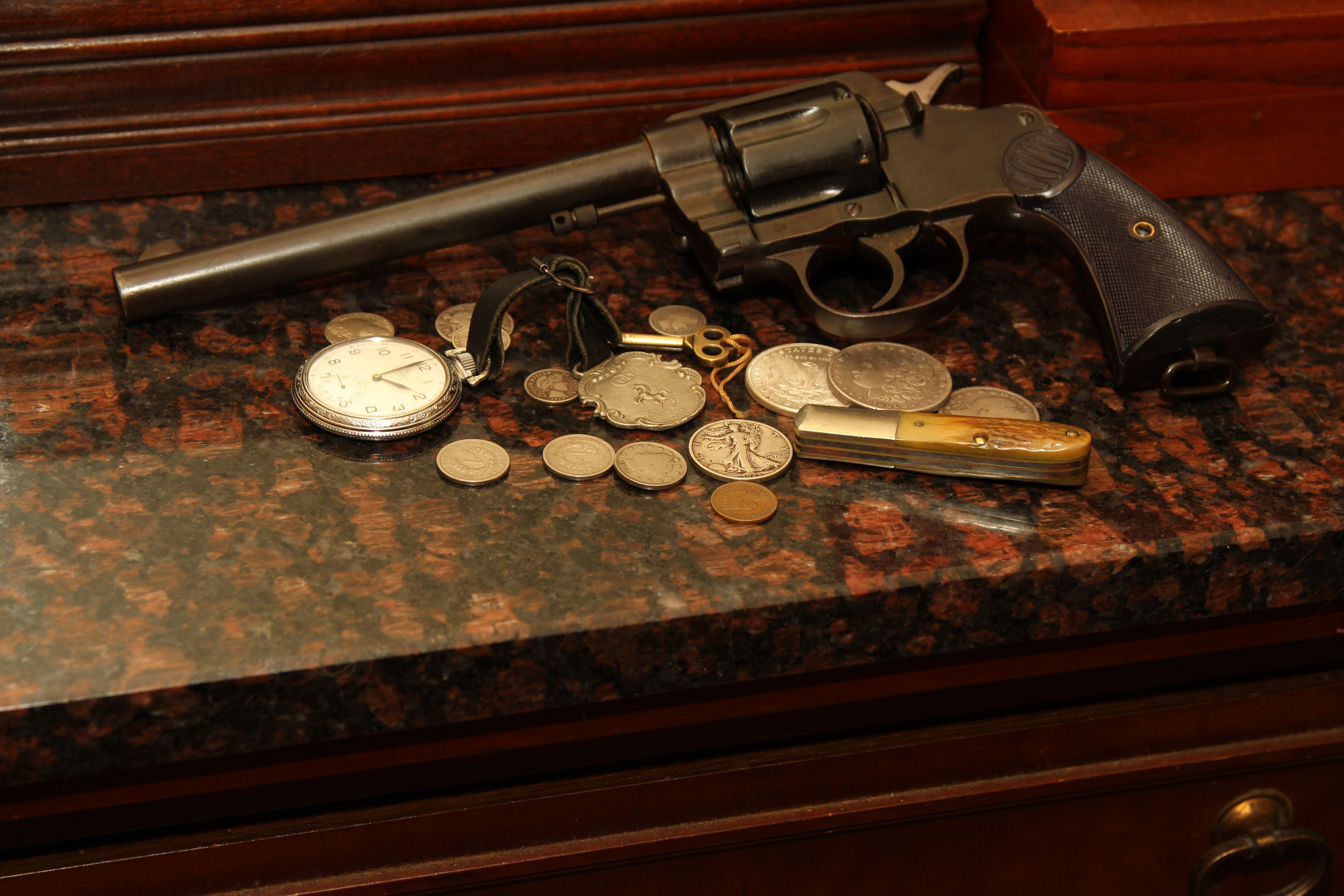
Early variation .44 WCF made in 1906

=== Model 1909 ===
The Colt M1892 revolver was thought of as a decent handgun for its time, but complaints soon arose concerning the stopping power of the .38 Long Colt. Beginning in 1899, combat reports from the Philippines campaign showed that the .38 caliber bullets repeatedly failed to stop Moro fighters, even when shot multiple times at close range. The complaints caused the U.S. Army to hurriedly re-issue the now retired .45 caliber Colt Single Action Army revolvers with a newly shortened 5 1/2-inch-barrel (140 mm) version, cut down from the original 7 1/2-inch (190 mm) barrels. These old revolvers easily stopped the kris- and bolo-wielding combatants and this played a central role in the Army's decision to replace the M1892 with the .45 caliber New Service revolver in 1909. The Model 1909 was also chambered for the .45 Calibre Revolver Ball Cartridge, Model of 1909, which was dimensionally similar to the original .45 Colt cartridge, but it has a rim that is .03 inches (0.76 mm) wider for a more positive ejection with the use of the swing-out cylinder's star extractor. It also played a key role in the Army's decision to adopt the new .45 ACP M1911 Colt pistol, only two years later in 1911. The Model 1909 in .45 Colt with a 5 1/2-inch (140 mm) barrel, was adopted by the U.S. Armed Forces as the "Model 1909 U.S. Army", the "Model 1909 U.S. Navy" and the "USMC Model 1909".

=== British .455 Webley Model ===
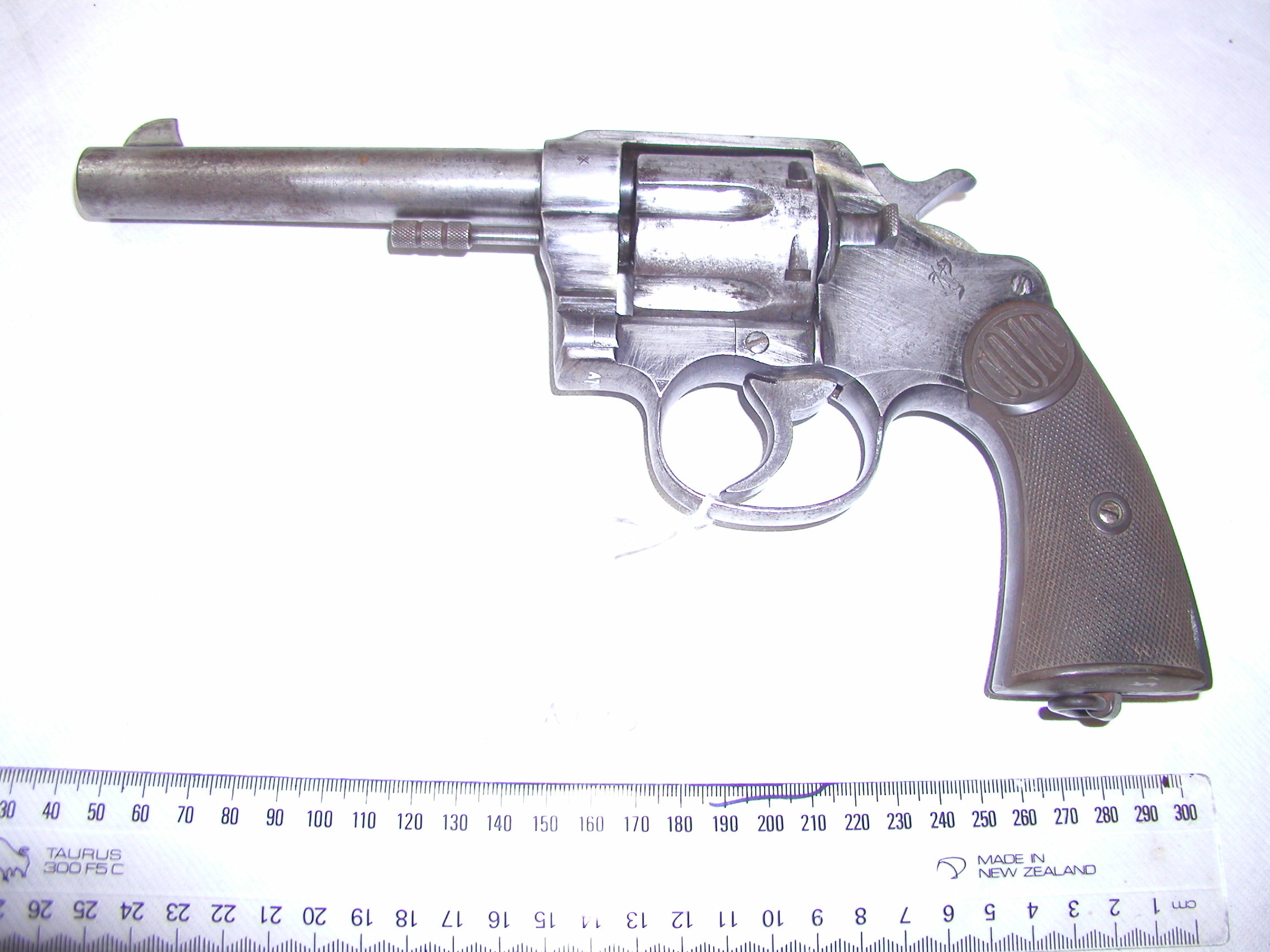
Colt New Service Model 1898 revolver, circa WWI .455-inch calibre

In 1899 Canada acquired a number of New Service revolvers (chambered in .45 Colt) for Boer War service, to supplement its existing M1878 Colt Double Action revolvers in the same caliber. In 1904 and 1905 the North-West Mounted Police in Canada also adopted the Colt New Service to replace the less-than satisfactory Enfield Mk II revolver in service since 1882.

New Service revolvers, designated as Pistol, Colt, .455-inch 5.5-inch barrel Mk. I, chambered for the .455 Webley cartridge were acquired for issue as "substitute standard" by the British War Department during World War I. British Empire Colt New Service Revolvers were stamped "NEW SERVICE .455 ELEY" on the barrel, to differentiate them from the .45 Colt versions used by the US (and Canada).

The Colt New Service was a popular revolver with British officers and many of them had privately purchased their own Colt New Service revolvers in the years prior to World War I as an alternative to the standard-issue Webley Revolver. British Empire and Canadian forces received 60,000 Colt New Service revolvers during World War I and they continued to see official service until the end of World War II.

=== Colt M1917 revolver ===
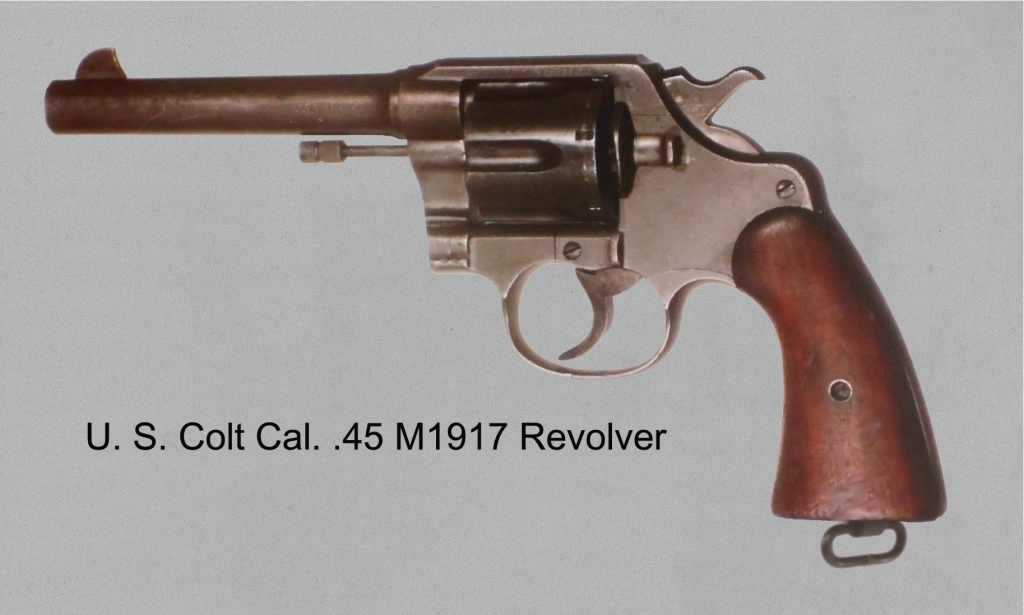
U.S. Colt .45 M1917 Revolver

The U.S. Army Model 1917 was created to supplement insufficient stocks of M1911 pistols during World War I. The Colt M1917 Revolver was a New Service with a cylinder bored to take the .45 ACP cartridge and the half-moon clips to hold the rimless cartridges in position. Later production Colt M1917 revolvers had headspacing machined into the cylinder chambers, just as the Smith & Wesson M1917 revolvers had from the start. Newer Colt production could be fired without the half-moon clips, but the empty cartridge cases had to be ejected with a device such as a cleaning rod or pencil, as the cylinder extractor and ejector would pass over the rims of the rimless cartridges. As a result of these issues, a commercial rimmed cartridge the .45 Auto Rim was developed that allowed the M1917 to be fired without the need for moon-clips. After World War I, the revolver gained a strong following among civilian shooters. The M1917s saw action again during World War II, when it was issued to "specialty troops such as tankers and artillery personnel". During the Korean War, they were again issued to support troops, and even used by "tunnel rats" during the Vietnam War.

=== Fitz Special ===
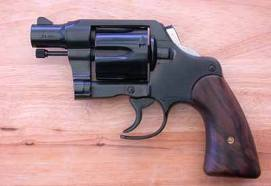
Fitz Special

John Henry Fitzgerald first came up with the Fitz Special snubnosed revolver concept around the mid-1920s, when he modified a .38 Special Colt Police Positive Special revolver, whose shortest available barrel length was 4 inches (100 mm). He later modified two .45 Colt New Service revolvers in the same manner, and was known to carry the pair in his front pockets.

Fitz Special revolvers are made by taking any standard size Colt revolver, shortening the barrel to two inches, shortening the ejector rod, bobbing the hammer spur, rounding the butt, and removing the front half of the trigger guard. Reshaping the hammer and the butt allows the gun to be drawn quickly with little risk of the weapon snagging on clothing. The halved trigger guard facilitates quick trigger acquisition, even for shooters with large fingers or gloves.

Historians believe that somewhere between 40 and 200 Fitz Specials left the factory, made from various Colt revolvers, by Fitzgerald himself. The Fitz Special was the precursor to the modern snubnosed revolver, and specifically the prototype for the Colt Detective Special, the first production two-inch snubnosed revolver. Even after the introduction of the Detective Special in 1927, Fitz continued to make custom revolvers for special clients.

Colonels Rex Applegate and Charles Askins were proponents of the Fitz Special, and it would become a popular after-market conversion for many gunsmiths. Charles Lindbergh, William Powell and Clyde Barrow were also known to carry Fitz Specials.

=== .357 Magnum Models ===
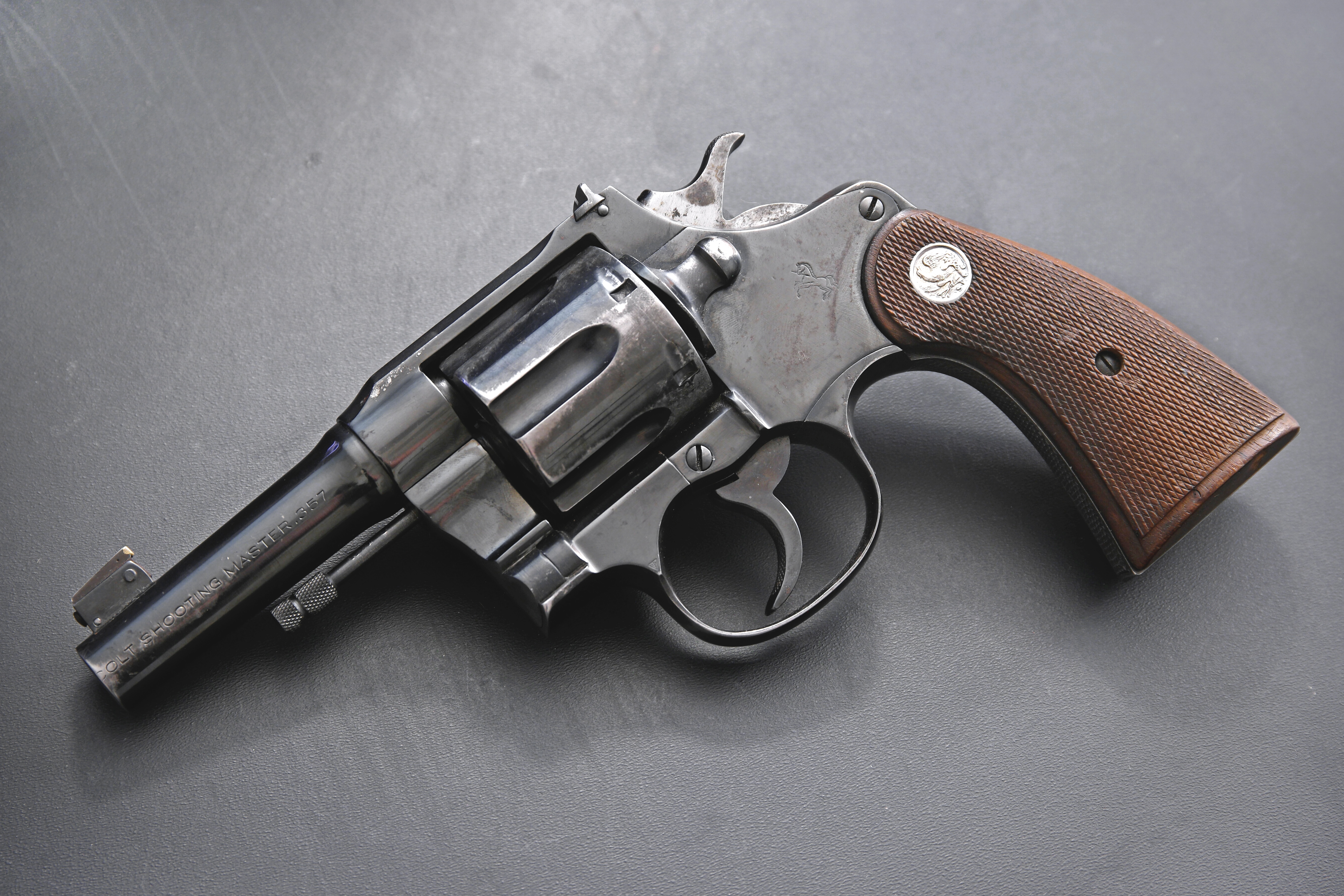
Custom Colt Shooting Master .357 Magnum with barrel shortened to 4 in (100 mm)

In 1933, the New Service was chambered for .38 Special and .44 Russian, other less common calibers were discontinued. In 1936, the New Service was chambered for new .357 Magnum cartridge. As one of the most powerful handgun cartridges available of the time, it was easily capable of penetrating the automobile bodies and body armor used by the gangsters, bank robbers, and fugitives of that era. As such, it became instantly popular with Lawmen, State Troopers and Highway Patrolmen. These guns were offered with barrel lengths of 4, 5 and 6 inches (100, 130 and 150 mm). The early models came with checkered walnut grips, while the later models used plastic-like "Coltwood" grips.

With the onset of World War II the Colt New Service was discontinued in 1941. It was the largest revolver ever manufactured by Colt and one of the largest production revolvers of all time until the introduction of the .44 Magnum Colt Anaconda in 1990. There are several generational variants including the "Old Model" (which refers to the first 21,000 units made), "Transitional Model" (which incorporated a hammer-block safety), "Improved Model" (325,000 units), and "Late Model" (manufactured from 1928 to 1941). A "Target Model", "Shooting Master", and "Deluxe Target Model" were offered as well.
