= Colt Cobra =

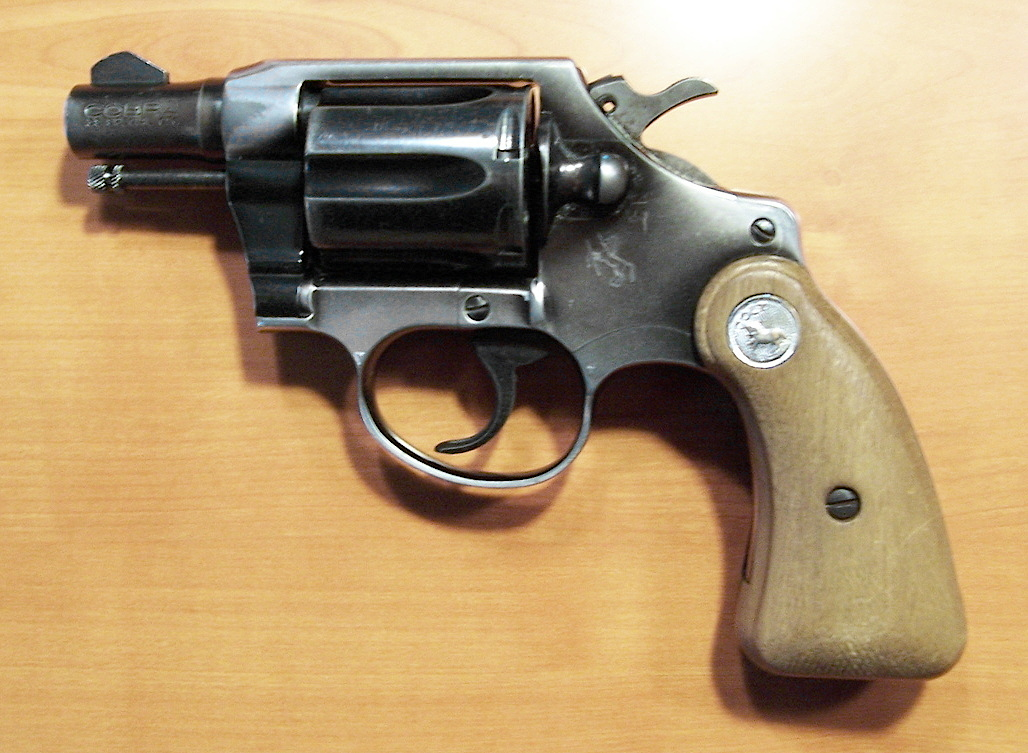
- Colt Cobra .38 Special
- Type: Revolver
- Place of origin: United States

Service history
- Wars: Vietnam War; Laotian Civil War; Lebanese Civil War

Production history
- Manufacturer: Colt
- Produced: First Series: 1950–1972; Second Series: 1973–1981; Third Series: 2017–present
- Variants: Colt Aircrewman, Colt Courier, Colt Agent, Colt Viper

Specifications
- Mass: 15 oz (430 g) (pre-1981); 25 oz (710 g) (post 2017)
- Length: 6.75 in (171 mm) (pre-1981); 7.2 in (180 mm) (post 2017)
- Barrel length: 2 in (51 mm), 3 in (76 mm), 4 in (100 mm), 5 in (130 mm)
- Width: 1.25 in (32 mm) (pre-1981); 1.4 in (36 mm) (post 2017)
- Height: 4.5 in (110 mm) (pre-1981); 4.9 in (120 mm) (post 2017)
- Caliber: .38 Special.38 Colt New Police.32 Colt New Police.22 LR.357 Magnum (2024 Viper only)
- Action: Revolver DA/SA
- Feed system: 6-round Cylinder

The Colt Cobra is a lightweight, aluminum-framed, double-action snubnosed revolver, not to be confused with the Colt King Cobra. The Cobra was chambered in .38 Special, .38 Colt New Police, .32 Colt New Police, and .22 Long Rifle. It holds six shots of ammunition and was sold by Colt from 1950 until 1981. In December 2016, it was announced that Colt would be producing new run Colt Cobras with a steel frame and a fiber optic front sight. This model was released in early 2017.

== Product development and usage ==
The Cobra was made in three models: the First Model, made from 1950–1972 and weighing 15 ounces unloaded with 2-inch barrel, and an improved Second Model, made from 1973–1981, recognizable by its shrouded ejector rod, oversized wood gripstocks and Baughman-style ramp front sight, with an unloaded weight of 16 ounces. The third issue debuted from 2017 in stainless steel finishes and are rated for 38 +P Spl. cartridges. None of the Cobra models are rated for 38 +P+ Spl cartridges.

The Cobra is the same overall size and configuration as the famous Colt Detective Special and uses the same size "D" frame, except that the Cobra's frame is constructed of lightweight aluminum alloy as compared to the all-steel frame of the Detective Special. In the mid-1960s, the Detective Special's and Cobra's grip frame was shortened to the same size as that of the Agent.

The Cobra was produced in calibers .38 Special, 32 Colt New Police, .22 LR, and a rare few in .38 S&W. The .38 Special Cobra was available in 2, 3 and 4 inch barrel lengths. The .32 caliber version was available in 2- and 3-inch barrel lengths. The .22 LR Cobra was available only with the 3-inch barrel.

Standard Cobras were blued with round-butt grip frames. All Cobras were available with a nickel finish at additional cost. Early model 1st issue series was supplied as square-butt grip.

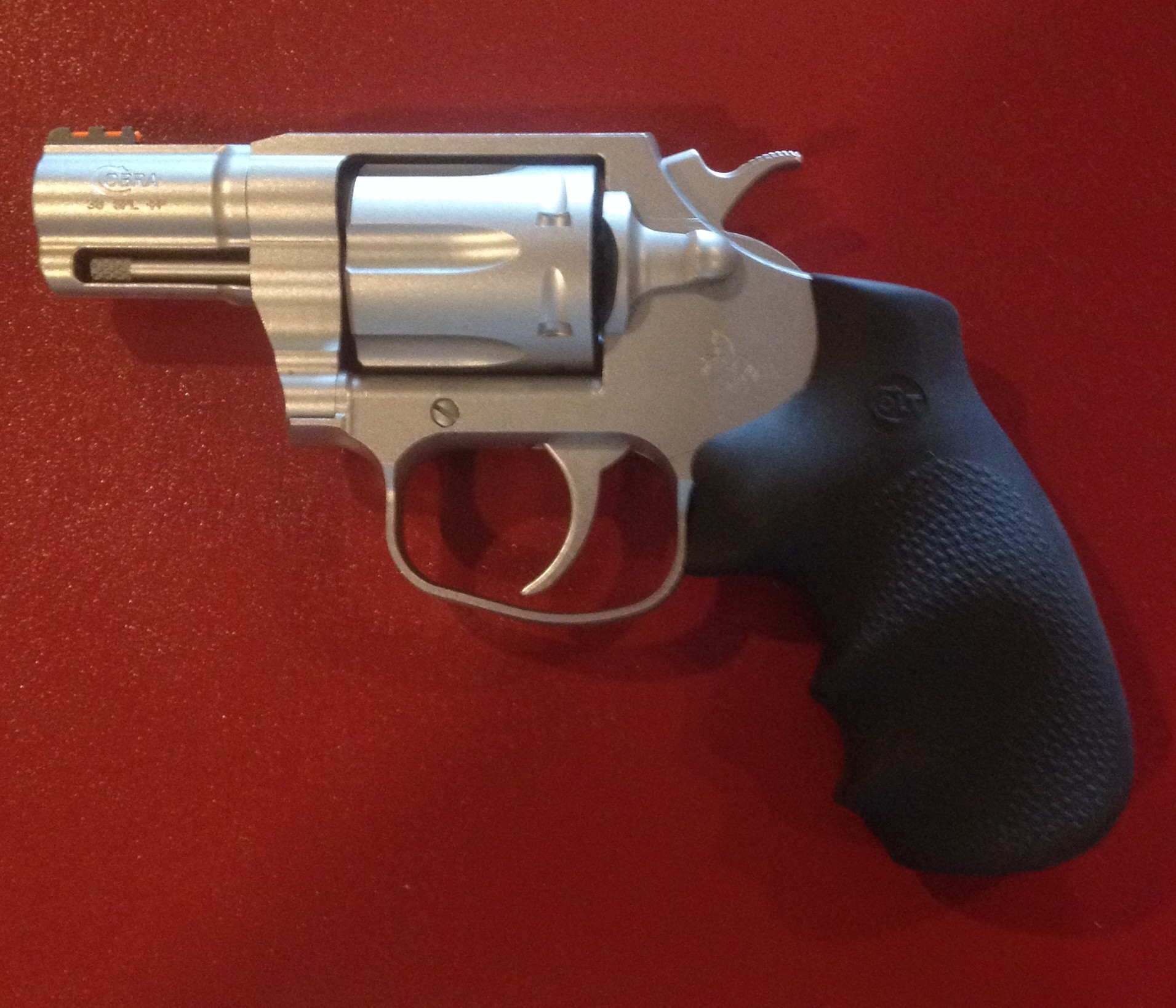
Colt Cobra revolver 2017 re-release.

It was announced in 2016 that Colt would re-release the Colt Cobra in 2017. The Third Model (2017–present) is offered only as a 6 shot double action/single action revolver in .38 Special (+P Capable) with a 2" barrel. This model will be offered with a Matte Stainless Steel finish and has an unloaded weight of 25 ounces. At the 2018 Shot Show, Colt debuted the Colt Night Cobra, which has a matte black finish and a front night sight. It is also double action only.

== Production subvariants ==
=== Colt Aircrewman ===
The Colt M13 Aircrewman was an ultra-lightweight version of the Detective Special constructed of aluminum alloy, and made from 1951 to 1957 for use by United States Air Force aircrews. They are distinguished by the Air Force medallion in place of the Colt medallion on the checkered wooden grips, as well as a cylinder made of aluminum alloy. Within two years of issuance, reports of cylinder and/or frame failure began to plague the Aircrewman and its Smith & Wesson counterpart, the Smith & Wesson Model 12, despite issuing a dedicated low-pressure .38 Special military cartridge, the Caliber .38 Ball, M41 round. However, the cylinder fractures continued, and the weapons were eventually withdrawn from service.

=== Colt Courier ===
The Courier was a 3-inch variant of the Cobra with a special, short grip frame. It was produced in both .22 Long Rifle and .32 Colt New Police. The frame and cylinder of the .32 model are constructed of lightweight aluminum alloy, and the gun weighs 13.5 ounces. Only the frame of the .22 model was constructed of aluminum alloy, with a total weight of 19.5 ounces. It was made from 1954 to 1956. Approximately 3,053 were produced in the two years. The .32 Courier remains the only commercially produced Colt to ever have an alloy cylinder.

=== Colt Agent ===
The Colt Agent was another model similar to the Cobra. The original Agents were very well made, with high polished finishes and highly checkered walnut grips. The bottom of the Agent grips was slightly shorter than that of the Cobra. The original Agent weighed 14 ounces and was available only in .38 Special caliber, with a 2-inch barrel and blued finish. It was made from 1955 to 1979. The original Agents had a smaller grip frame from the Cobra which made for a deeper concealment and the grip frame was later changed to match the Cobra in the late 60s. A slightly revised version of the Agent was released in 1973 with a shrouded ejector rod, with a weight of 16 ounces. In 1982, the Agent was briefly revived by Colt, this time with a parkerized finish; production continued until 1986, which made the Agent a much cheaper version of the Cobra.

=== Colt Viper ===
The Viper was essentially a 4-inch barreled version of the alloy-framed Colt Cobra in .38 Special. Introduced in 1977 and only produced that year, the Viper did not sell as well as Colt expected and was discontinued. In recent years, owing to its limited production run, the Viper has become quite collectable. Examples in good condition fetch unusually high prices. In 2024, Colt reintroduced the Viper, with similar wood grips to the original. However, apart from cosmetic resemblance, the new Viper has little in common with the original. The new Viper, like the new Cobra, is made from a steel frame, but unlike the new Cobra, the new Viper is chambered in .357 Magnum. The new Viper is also available in 3-inch and 4.25-inch barrel lengths.

== Ammunition ==
Some have recommended against the use of +P-rated .38 Special cartridges in aluminum-framed Colt revolvers, as the Cobra was designed well before the "+P" designation. Others point out that +P ammunition is the same pressure as the regular pressure ammunition was before SAAMI lowered the standards in 1972 as a result of industry requests. They point out that the post-'72 loads are merely regular pressure ammunition labeled as "+P". Some experts have done considerable testing so as to prove that +P .38 specials are not truly hot loads.

In the owners' manual accompanying some post-1972 Cobra revolvers, Colt recommended the use of +P ammunition for 2nd Model Cobra frames only, with the stipulation that the gun be returned to the factory for inspection every 1,000 rounds (compared with a 2,000–3,000 round interval for the 2nd Model steel-framed Detective Special).

The new 2017 reintroduction Colt Cobra revolver is rated to accept +P ammunition.

The Cobra should never be fired with extreme-pressure +P+ ammunition as there are no industry standards for such loads.

== Notable users ==
- Jack Ruby used a Colt Cobra .38 to kill Lee Harvey Oswald on November 24, 1963 as Dallas, Texas law enforcement officials were transporting Oswald from the city jail to the county jail. The infamous gun was purchased for $220,000 at an auction held by Herman Darvick Autograph Auctions in New York City on December 26, 1991 by collector Anthony V. Pugliese III of Delray Beach, Florida. It was consigned by Jack Ruby's brother, Earl Ruby.
- Lee Marvin carried two Colt Cobras while playing Detective-Lieutenant Frank Balinger of the Chicago Police Department on the television series M Squad.
- Monika Ertl used a Colt Cobra .38 to kill Roberto Quintanilla, the man who cut off the hands of the corpse of Che Guevara, in 1971.
- Legendary music producer Phil Spector was convicted of murdering actress Lana Clarkson with a Colt Cobra .38 at his Alhambra, California home in 2003.
- The Colt Cobra was the favourite weapon of Michele Cavataio, in fact he used this weapon into the first mafia war.
- Ray Midge, the protagonist of The Dog of the South by Charles Portis, has this gun confiscated by a border agent while trying to smuggle it from Mexico into Belize in a lemon pie box.
- This is the gun that Hunter Biden is alleged to have bought in relation to the gun charge brought against him.
