= FitzGerald Special =

Snubnosed revolver

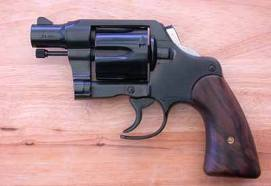
The Fitz Special.

The Fitz Gerald Special, "Fitz Special", or "Fitz Colt" is a snubnosed revolver concept that was pioneered by John Henry Fitzgerald (also known as "Fitz"), an employee of Colt Firearms from 1918 to 1944.

== Design ==
A standard-size Colt revolver can be made into a Fitz Special by shortening the barrel to two inches or less, attaching a new front sight, shortening the ejector rod, bobbing the hammer spur, rounding the butt, and removing the front half of the trigger guard.

Reshaping the hammer and the butt allows the gun to be drawn quickly with little risk of the weapon snagging on clothing. The halved trigger guard facilitates quick trigger acquisition, even for shooters with large fingers or gloves.

== Production ==
The estimated total production of Fitz Specials is generally accepted as being under 200, with some historians arguing that fewer than 40 were produced.

== John Henry Fitzgerald ==
During his younger days, Fitzgerald spent much of his time as a bare-knuckles prizefighter long before boxing gloves were used. Developing an interest in firearms at an early age, Fitzgerald became a champion pistol shot.

He preferred Colt revolvers, especially the New Service, to all others and became quite adept at improving their actions by adjusting springs and smoothing and modifying internal parts. By 1918 he had become quite well known and was hired as a salesman by Colt Firearms."

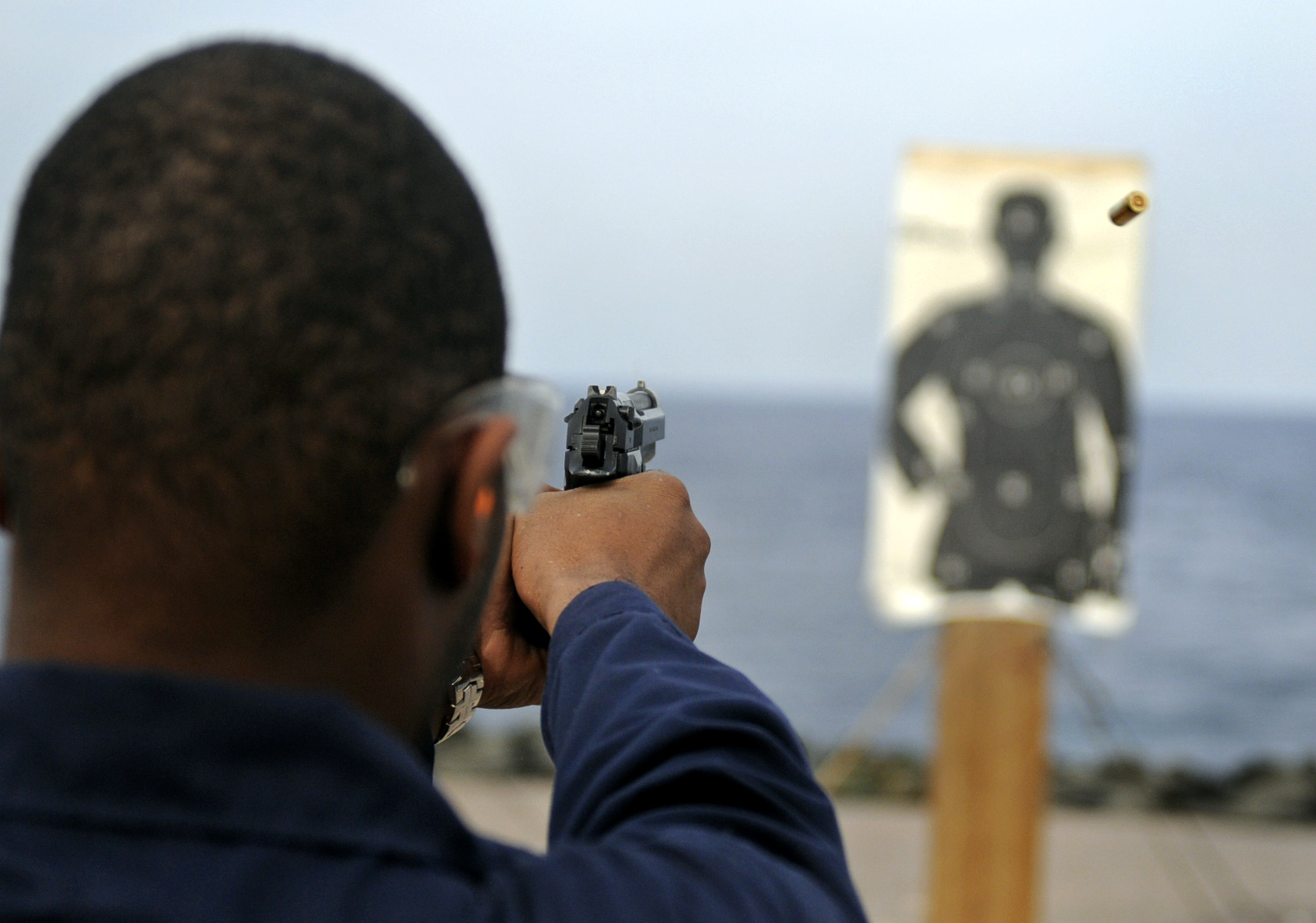
A sailor shooting at a "Colt Police Silhouette Target"

Fitzgerald developed his snubnosed revolver concept around the mid-1920s, when as an employee for Colt Firearms, he converted a .38 Special Colt Police Positive Special revolver, into his first Fitz Special.

He later converted two .45 Colt New Service revolvers in the same manner, and was known to carry the pair in his front pockets.

He was also a New York State Trooper, a police firearms instructor and a noted firearms expert. In 1930 he published a book titled Shooting, strongly advocating his snubnosed revolver concept as well as other topics of pistol shooting techniques and tactics.

He developed the famous "Colt Police Silhouette Target" at a time when most shooters were still using bulls-eye targets and was strong and early advocate of practical shooting:

Practical shooting is the placing of your bullets in the human body in such a manner that said human will be unable to shoot at you. The penalty for not being able to do this is the loss of your own life.

— John Henry Fitzgerald

He was a strong proponent for the use of large caliber handguns, such as the .45 ACP Colt 1911 and was especially fond of using .45 Colt New Service revolvers. He was among the first to advocate the two-handed shooting stance that was developed further into the Modern technique by Jack Weaver and Jeff Cooper beginning in the 1960s.

His ideas would become the foundation of modern firearms training and influence generations of firearms instructors.

== Reception ==
Colonels Rex Applegate and Charles Askins were proponents of the Fitz Special.

Applegate himself carried a .45 ACP New Service Fitz Special with ivory handles that was even engraved with "TO REX FROM FITZ."

Askins called his .45 Colt New Service Fitz Special "The grandest defense gun I have ever had." Charles Lindbergh, William Powell and Clyde Barrow were also known to carry Fitz Specials.

The Fitz Special would go on to become a popular after-market conversion for many gunsmiths.

== Legacy ==
The Fitz Special was the precursor of the modern snubnosed revolver and specifically the prototype for the Colt Detective Special, the first production two-inch snubnosed revolver.

Even after the introduction of the Detective Special in 1927, Fitz continued to make custom revolvers by special order.

== In popular culture ==
On the television series Blue Bloods, the character of NYPD Commissioner Frank Reagan (portrayed by Tom Selleck) carries a Fitz Special as his standard duty weapon. It was given to him by his father Henry, a retired NYPD Commissioner, who used it during his career; he had in turn received it from his late father, who had also served on the force.

A revolver based on the Fitz Special design also appears on the cover of the fifth James Bond novel, From Russia, with Love. It was modeled after a gun provided by firearms expert and author Geoffrey Boothroyd, who was also a James Bond fan; Boothroyd advised author Ian Fleming about the weapons used in the novels and would provide the inspiration for the character of Q.

However, the weapon on the cover differs from a true Fitz Special in two respects, its intact hammer and the fact that it is a Smith & Wesson model rather than a Colt.
