= Smith & Wesson Model 460 =

Smith & Wesson Model 460XVR
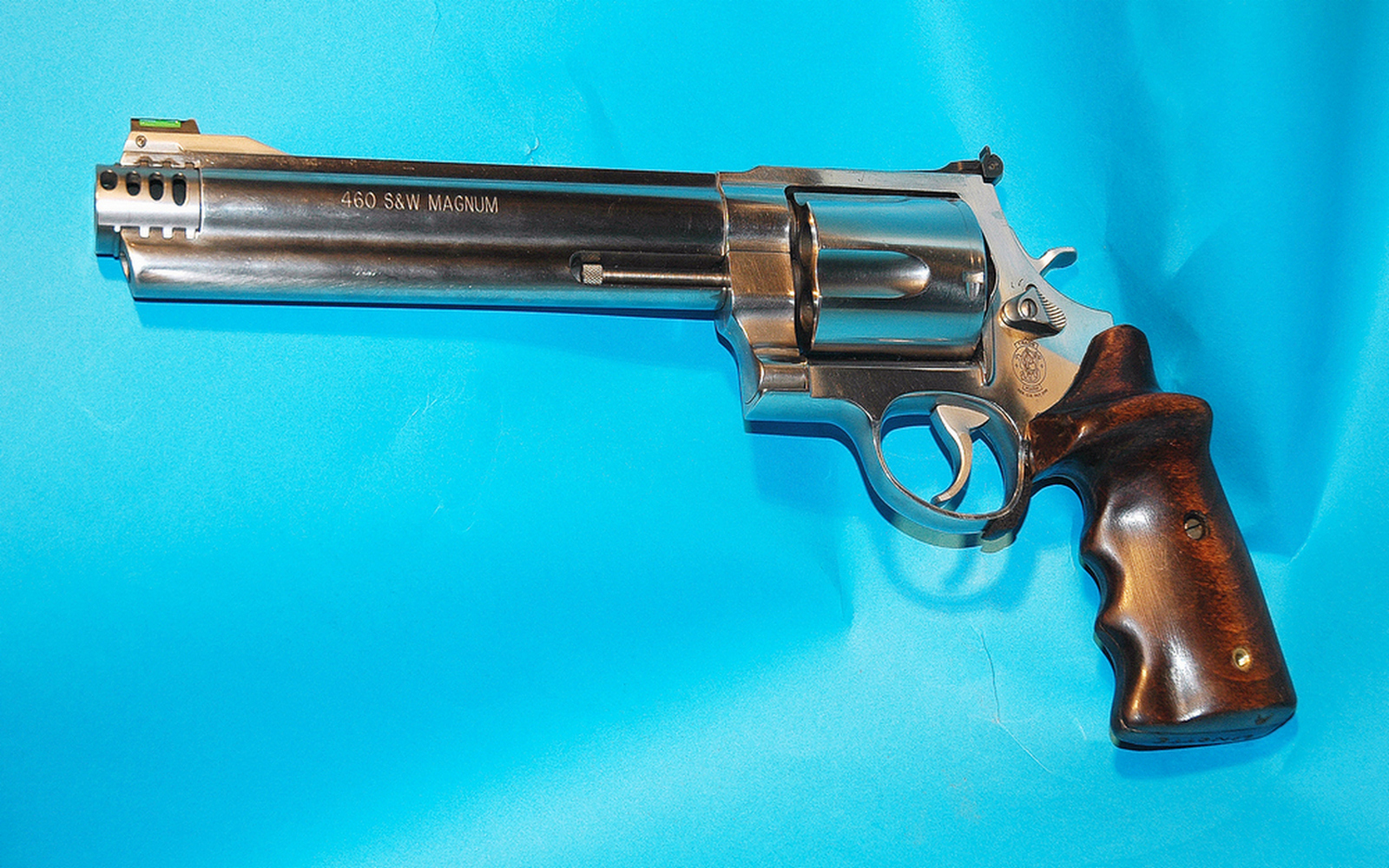
- Customized Smith & Wesson Model 460XVR showing factory sights and barrel detail.
- Type: Revolver
- Place of origin: United States

Production history
- Manufacturer: Smith & Wesson
- Produced: 2005–present

Specifications
- Barrel length: 2.75–8.375 inches (69.9–212.7 mm)
- Cartridge: .454 Casull.45 Colt.45 Schofield.460 S&W Magnum
- Action: Double-action/single-action
- Muzzle velocity: 200 grains (13 grams) at 2,330 feet per second (710 metres per second)
- Feed system: 5-round cylinder
- Sights: Open with provision for a scope

Smith & Wesson Model 460 is a large bore five-shot, single-action/double-action revolver by Smith & Wesson chambered for the .460 S&W Magnum cartridge. It was designed as a hunting and dangerous game defensive revolver for use in Africa and Alaska. The revolver is built on the company's largest and strongest frame, known as the X-Frame, and represents a joint effort among Smith & Wesson, Hornady, and Cor-Bon.

== Design ==
The basic design of the Model 460 is based on another X-frame revolver, its counterpart, the Smith & Wesson Model 500, a .50 caliber revolver.

Aside from the .460 S&W Magnum cartridge, the revolver can also chamber .454 Casull, .45 Colt, and .45 Schofield ammunition. Smith & Wesson states that Model 460 XVR (XVR stands for X-treme Velocity Revolver) is the highest velocity production revolver, while being the most powerful .45 caliber production revolver in the world, launching a 200-grain (13-gram) bullet at 2,330 feet per second (710 meters per second), generating 2,416 foot-pounds force (3,276 joules) of muzzle energy.

This revolver uses gain-twist rifling, starting with a slow twist rate of one turn in 100 in and gradually increasing up to one turn in 20 in to accommodate the combination of a heavy bullet and high pressure and velocity typical for the round.

The S&W Model 460 won the Shooting Industry Academy of Excellence Handgun of the year Award when it debuted in 2005.

== Variants ==
Smith & Wesson offers several variants of this revolver. Some with short barrels like the Model 460 ES are intended for use in survival kits in small planes should they crash land in Alaskan Bear Country while others with barrels as long as 14" are intended as a primary hunting arm.

- Model 460 ES 2.75" Barrel, Emergency Survival snubnosed revolver with neon yellow Hogue grips (no longer manufactured)
- Model 460 XVR Performance Center 3.5" Barrel, HI-VIZ® Fiber Optic Green front sight
- Model 460 V 5" Barrel, Muzzle Brake (the V stands for 5 referring to the length of the barrel)
- Model 460 V 5" Barrel, Muzzle Brake "OD Green Carry Combo" (OD green Hogue grips, DeSantis green digital camo holster, DeSantis green digital belt ammo carrier; Custom OD green S&W gun case)
- Model 460 XVR 8.38" Barrel, Muzzle Brake
- Model 460 XVR Performance Center 10.5" Barrel, Muzzle Brake, Sling Swivels, Picatinny rail top
- Model 460 XVR Performance Center 12" Barrel, Sling Swivels, Picatinny rail top and bottom
- Model 460 XVR Performance Center 14" Barrel, Muzzle Brake, Sling Swivels, Picatinny rail top and bottom, bipod
