= Smith & Wesson Model 12 =

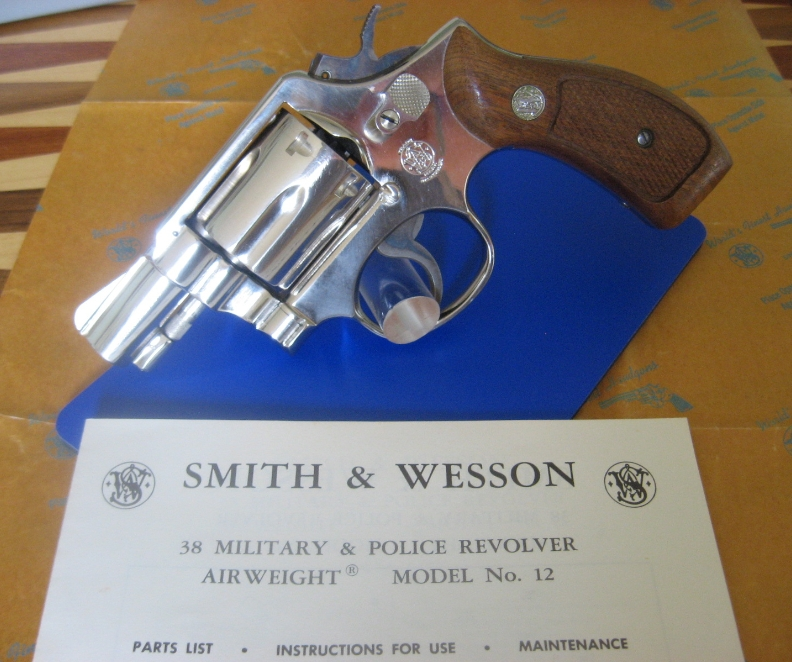
- 1976 S&W model 12-2
- Type: Revolver
- Place of origin: United States

Production history
- Manufacturer: Smith & Wesson
- Produced: 1953–1986

Specifications
- Mass: 17 oz (482 grams) 2 inch (50.8 mm) barrel and 19 oz (539 grams) 4 inch (101.6 mm) barrel
- Cartridge: .38 Special
- Action: Double-action
- Feed system: 6 round cylinder

The Smith & Wesson (S&W) Model 12 is a .38 Special revolver on Smith & Wesson's medium-sized K-frame. It is an aluminium alloy-frame version of the Model 10 (also known as the M&P). It was made from 1953 to 1986 in both two-inch (50.8 mm), 17 ounces (482g) and four-inch (101.6 mm), 19 ounces (539g) configurations. Early models used an aluminum cylinder as well as frame.

== Production variants ==
In 1953, the United States Air Force (USAF) ordered a variant of the S&W Military & Police Airweight with a two-inch barrel and aluminum cylinder to be issued to US Air Force flight crew members, called the Revolver, Lightweight, Caliber .38 Special, M13. Some 40,000 Smith & Wesson M13 revolvers were produced. After persistent reports on cylinder and frame failure with the M13 and its counterpart, the Colt Aircrewman, the Air Force attempted to remedy the issue by issuing a dedicated low-pressure .38 cartridge for the weapons—the Caliber .38, Ball, M41 round. However, after continued negative reports, Air Force officials decided that the revolvers were not suitable for issue, and the model was withdrawn from service, all but a few examples being crushed or destroyed.

A civilian model of the M13 was released in 1953, called the Military & Police Airweight. This designation was changed in 1957 to the Model 12 Airweight. The Military & Police Airweight initially used both an aluminum cylinder and frame, and weighed only 14.5 ounces. The aluminum cylinder proved insufficiently strong to withstand continued firing with standard .38 Special cartridges, and in 1954, S&W changed over all new production Airweight revolver cylinders to steel, increasing the weight to 18 ounces.

The Model 12 variants—12-1, 12-2, and 12-3—used a narrower hammer and had an aluminum grip frame that was 0.08-inch (2.0 mm) narrower than the standard steel K-frame. The final version, the Model 12-4, used the standard frame dimension of the other K-frames. It also featured a rounded butt.

- Pre-Model 12: predates model number markings. It has an alloy cylinder and will be a five-screw design with four sideplate screws and a screw in front of the trigger guard.
- Model 12 (1957):
  - -1 (1962): Change extractor rod to LH thread, eliminate screw in front of trigger guard
  - -2 (1962): Front sight changed from 1/10″ to 1/8″
  - -3 (1977): Gas ring on yoke to cylinder
  - -4 (1984): Change frame thickness to the same as all K-frames
