= Colt Police Positive Special =

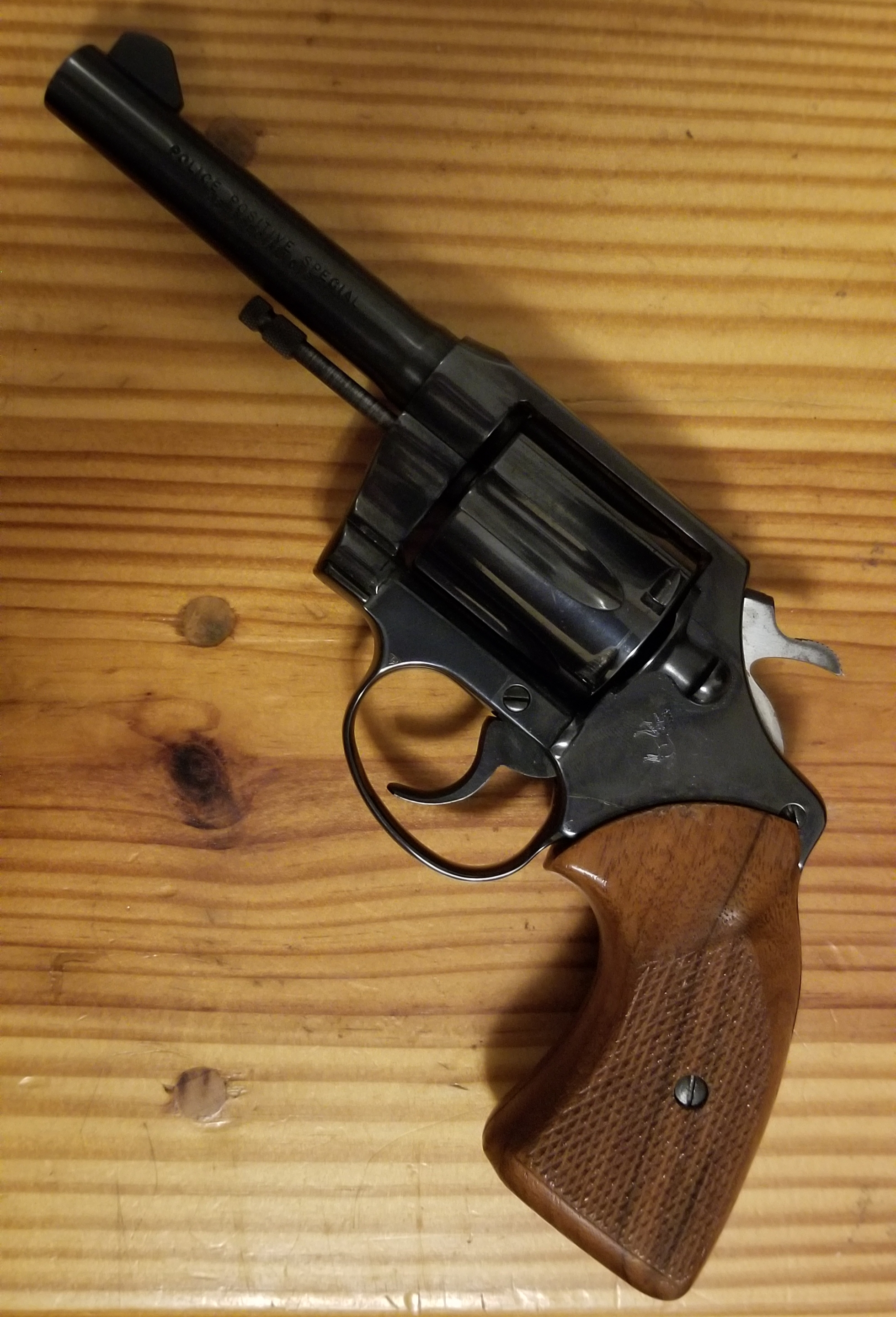
- .38 Colt Police Positive Special
- Type: Revolver
- Place of origin: United States

Service history
- In service: 1907–present
- Wars: Constitutionalist Revolution

Production history
- Manufacturer: Colt's Manufacturing Company
- Produced: 1907–1995
- No. built: over 750,000

Specifications
- Barrel length: 4 in (101.6 mm); 5 in (127 mm); 6 in (152.4 mm)
- Cartridge: .32 (.32 Colt New Police, .32-20 Winchester); .38 NP (.38 Colt New Police, .38 S&W); .38 Special (.38 Special)
- Action: Double-action
- Feed system: six round cylinder
- Sights: Fixed iron; Blade front, V-notch rear

Introduced in 1907, the Colt Police Positive Special is a small-frame, double-action revolver with a six-round cylinder, primarily chambered for .38 Special. The Police Positive Special was intended primarily for sale to law enforcement agencies and is one of Colt’s most widely produced revolver designs, with over 750,000 built.

== Development and history ==
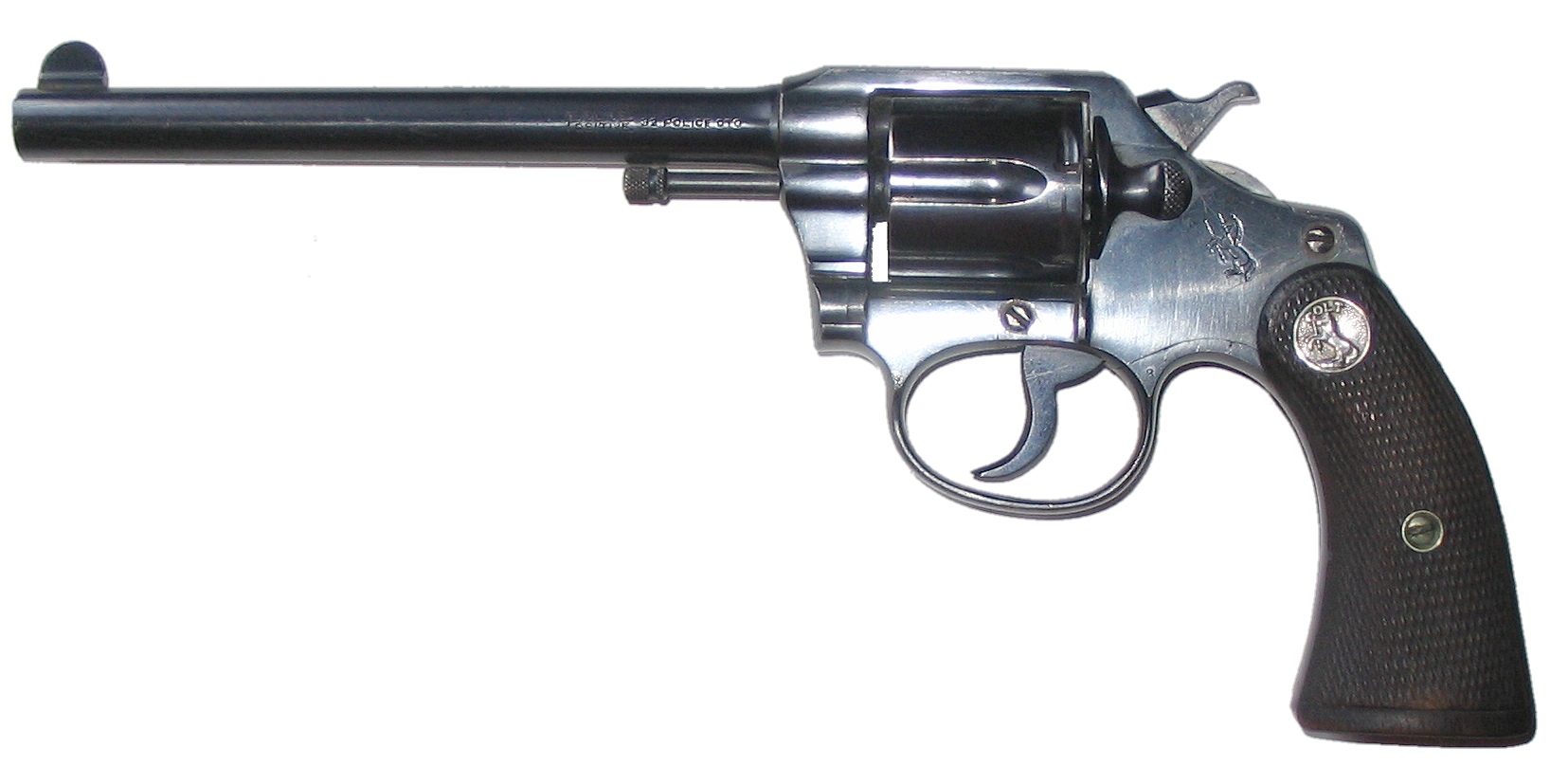
Colt Police Positive-revolver in .32 Colt New Police with a 6" barrel. This is a right-handed model.

The Police Positive Special was an iterative improvement of Colt's earlier Police Positive model, the only differences being a slightly lengthened cylinder and elongated and strengthened frame to allow the chambering of the longer, more powerful .32-20 Winchester and .38 Special cartridges. It was also made in .32 Colt New Police and .38 Colt New Police. It was made with 4-, 5- and 6-inch barrels and came with either wood or hard rubber grips.

In the early 20th century, the Colt Positive and Positive Special teamed with Colt's other admired model, the Official Police, to capture most of the law enforcement firearms market. Very popular with law enforcement officers due to its light weight, the Positive Special went through a number of series or “issues”. The first issue ran from introduction to 1927 and had the early 1900-era distinctive Colt black hard rubber grips. The second issue introduced wooden grips which were smooth in the early years, later giving way to a checkered style, also the smooth top strap was replaced with a serrated one to reduce glare. The Third issue began in 1947, and the Fourth issue in 1977 introduced a Colt Python-style shrouded ejector-rod housing. Production of the Police Positive Special ended in 1995.

== Features ==
Produced with fine carbon steel, the Positive Special featured Colt’s characteristic highly polished surfaces and was available with Colt's signature bright royal blued finish as well as a nickel-plated veneer. Built on Colt’s “D” frame, it was offered in four-, five-, and six-inch-barreled models, weighing a scant 23 ounces in the four-inch. The Positive Special also incorporated Colt’s “Positive Lock” safety which prevented the firing pin from hitting the primer unless the trigger was deliberately pulled. Intended to address deficiencies of earlier models such as the Single Action Army, Colt's Positive Lock prevented an accidental discharge even if the lowered hammer was struck or the pistol was dropped, allowing the revolver to be safely carried with all six chambers loaded. The pistol’s sights consisted of a blade front with a fixed iron open rear sight, which was a simple V-notch shaped groove milled into the revolver’s topstrap.

== Fitz Special ==
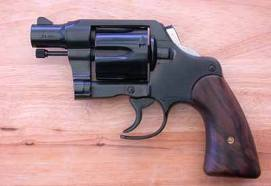
Fitz Special

John Henry Fitzgerald first came up with the Fitz Special snubnosed revolver concept around the mid-1920s, when he modified a .38 Special Colt Police Positive Special revolver, whose shortest available barrel length was four inches.

Fitz Special revolvers are made by taking any standard size Colt revolver, shortening the barrel to two inches, shortening the ejector rod, bobbing the hammer spur, rounding the butt, and removing the front half of the trigger guard. Reshaping the hammer and the butt allows the gun to be drawn quickly with little risk of the weapon snagging on clothing. The halved trigger guard facilitates quick trigger acquisition, even for shooters with large fingers or gloves.

Although some historians disagree, it is believed that somewhere between forty and two hundred Fitz Specials left the factory, made from various Colt revolvers, by Fitzgerald himself. The Fitz Special was the precursor to the modern snubnosed revolver and specifically the prototype for the Colt Detective Special the first production two-inch snubnosed revolver. Even after the introduction of the Detective Special in 1927, Fitz continued to make custom revolvers for special clientele.

Colonels Rex Applegate and Charles Askins were proponents of the Fitz Special, and it would become a popular after-market conversion for many gunsmiths. Charles Lindbergh, William Powell and Clyde Barrow were also known to carry Fitz Specials.
