= Colt Detective Special =

Detective Special
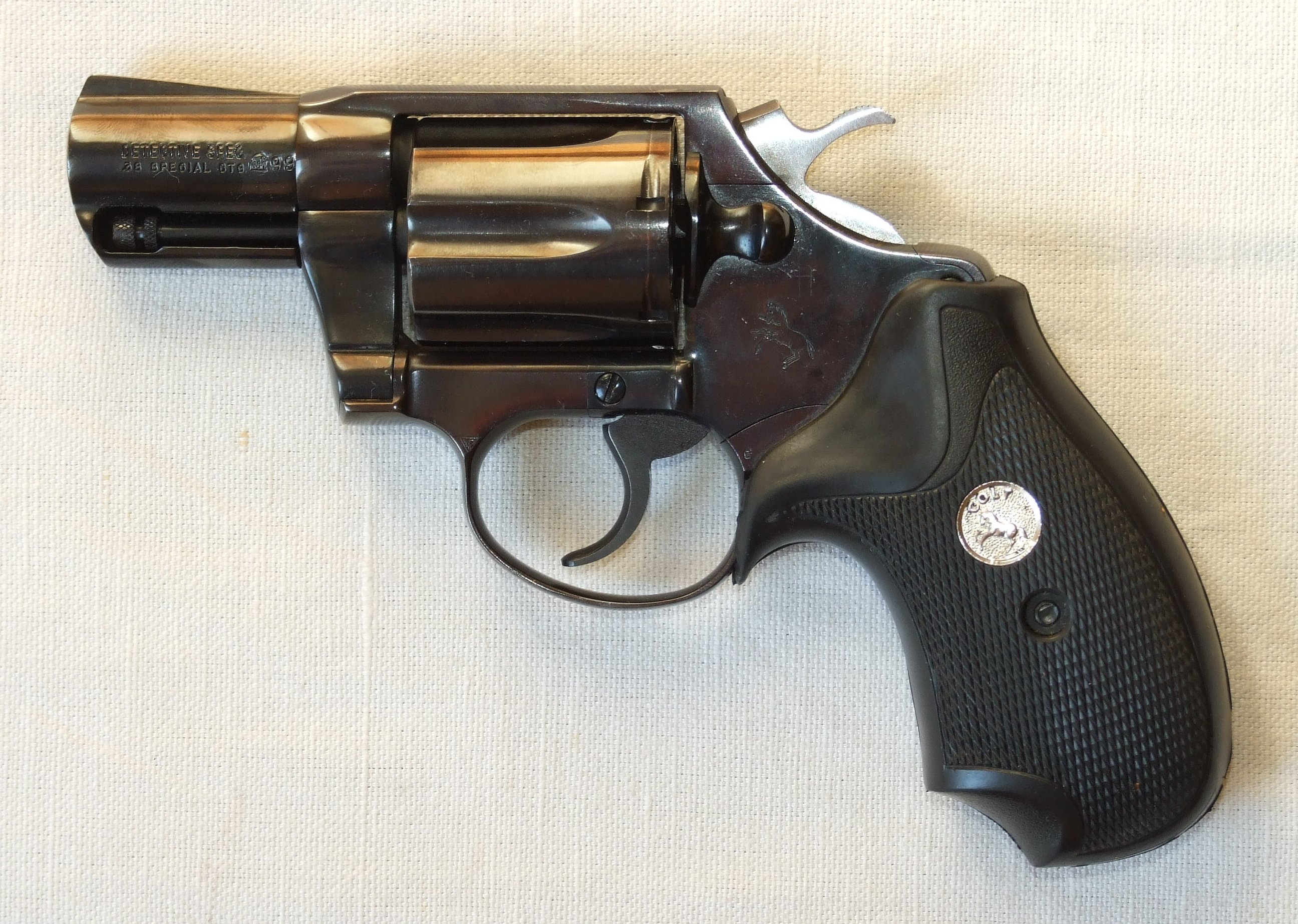
- A Colt Detective Special, Fourth Series (1992–1996), with rubber grips and a shrouded ejector rod
- Type: Revolver
- Place of origin: United States

Production history
- Manufacturer: Colt
- Produced: First Series: 1927–1946; Second Series: 1947–1972; Third Series: 1973–1986; Fourth Series: 1992–1996
- Variants: Fitz Special; Banker's Special; Commando Special; SF-VI/DS-II; Colt Magnum Carry

Specifications
- Mass: 21-ounce (600 g)
- Length: 6 3/4-inch (170 mm) for the 2-inch (51 mm) barrel 7 3/4-inch (200 mm) for the 3-inch (76 mm) barrel
- Barrel length: 2-inch (51 mm); 3-inch (76 mm)
- Cartridge: .32 New Police.38 New Police.38 Special
- Action: Double-action
- Feed system: 6-round cylinder
- Sights: Fixed open sights

The Colt Detective Special is a six-shot, carbon steel framed, 2-inch (51 mm) or 3-inch (76 mm) barreled, double-action revolver, and the first example of a class of firearms known as "snubnose revolvers".

== History ==
=== The Fitz Special ===
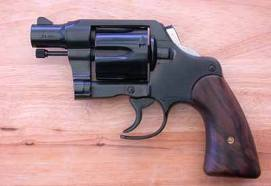
Fitz Special

John Henry Fitzgerald, an employee of Colt Firearms from 1918 to 1944, first came up with the Fitz Special concept around the mid-1920s based on a .38 Special Colt Police Positive Special revolver.

=== The Detective Special ===
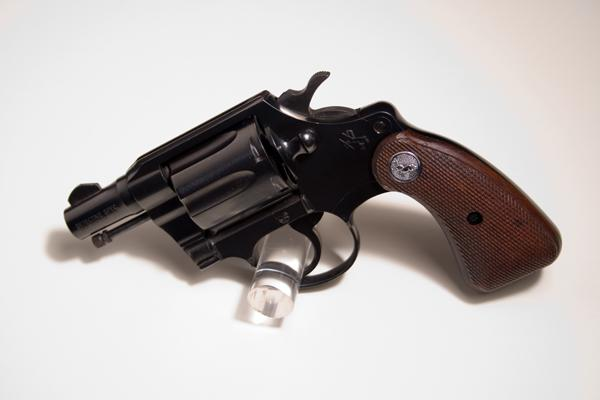
A Colt Detective Special, Second Series on display

Colt was so impressed with the Fitz Special that they decided to produce a sightly less radical version, the Detective Special.

It is simply a shortened and somewhat streamlined Colt Police Positive Special. The Detective Special proved to be an instant success and was made until 1996.

In 1996, lackluster sales saw the elimination of the Detective Special from the product line.

== Design ==
The Detective Special uses a slightly smaller frame than the Colt Official Police or Smith & Wesson Model 10 (K-Frame) revolvers, but is larger than the five-shot Smith & Wesson Model 36/Model 38/Model 42 (J-frame) revolvers.

Colt's Detective Special went through several issues or series.

=== First Series ===
The First Series was produced from 1927 to 1946. Compared to later production models, the First Series used a narrower frame, with reduced clearance between the frontstrap of the gripframe and the rear of the trigger guard. Other distinctive features included a shorter ejector rod with an ungrooved, knurled tip; a checkered hammer spur and cylinder latch, a "half-moon"–shaped front sight, and an overlapping screw and locking pin set-up on the right side of the frame. Grip panels were wooden.

A rounded butt on the metal frame became standard in 1933, but pieces with the original square butt (like that of the Police Positive Special) continued to be produced into the 1940s.

=== Second Series ===
The Second Series ran from 1947 to 1972. The ejector-rod was longer and had a groove in its knurled tip; a 3-inch (76 mm) barrel variant was offered, with a yet longer ejector rod. The cylinder latch was smooth, and the trigger spur serrated. The right side frame screw has no locking pin, and the rear half of the front sight is a serrated ramp. The grip panels were plastic in 1947, but were changed back to wood starting in 1955 (first with a silver-tone Colt medallion, and later a gold-tone).

An optional hammer shroud was available from the factory to prevent the hammer from catching on clothing.

Transition from the First to Second Series was gradual, with some post-WWII Second Series guns retaining short ejector rods and checkered hammers. Because of this, assigning a given revolver to a particular issue is best done by serial number.

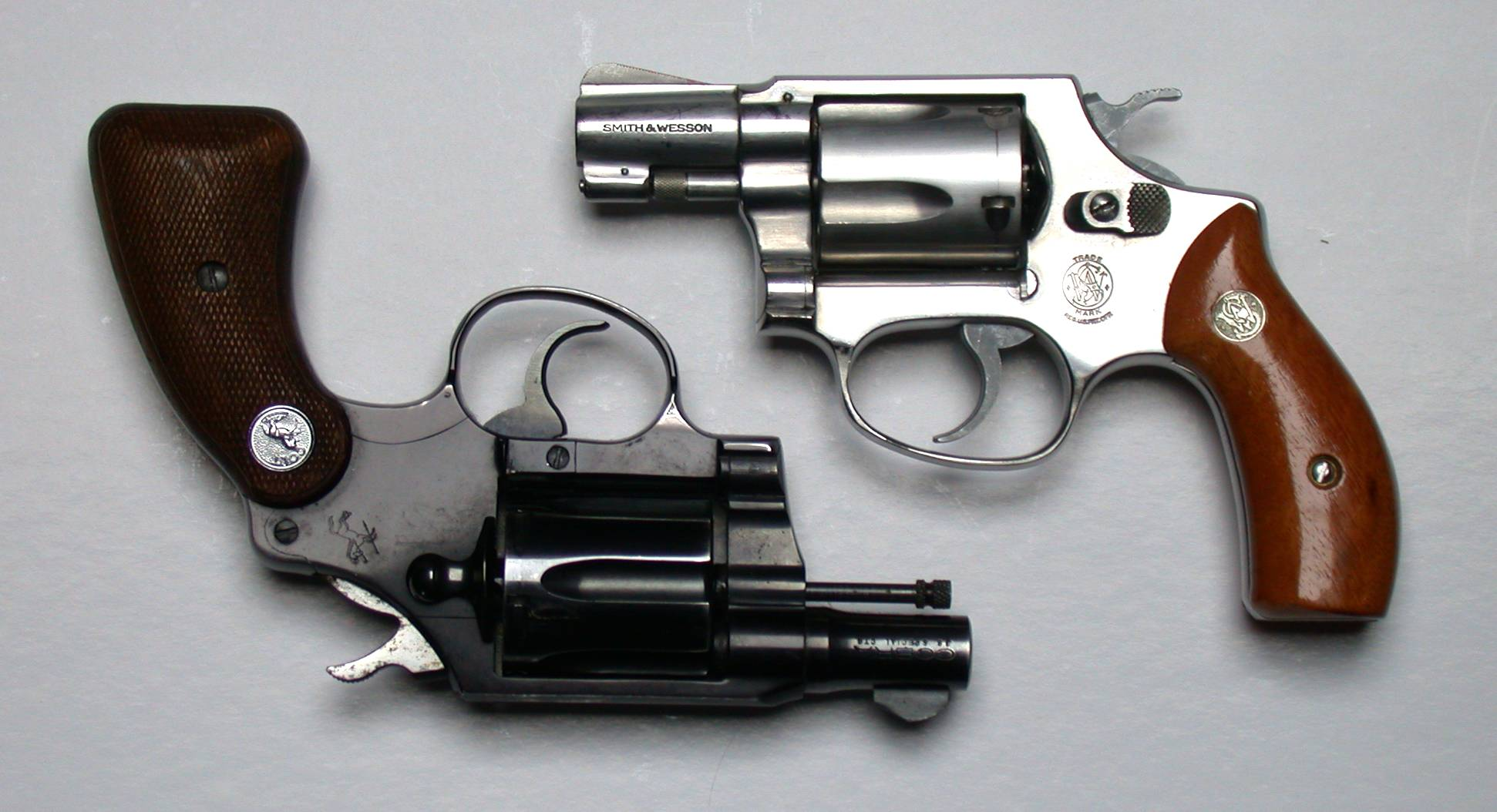
A Colt Detective Special and a Smith & Wesson Model 36 showing the differences in size between the two models.

During the 1960s, the grip frame of the Second Series Detective Special was shortened, matching that of Colt's other snub-nosed pistols, the Cobra and Agent.

Despite this alteration, the Detective Special's overall grip size remained unchanged, as Colt fitted the Second Series with new, lengthened gripstocks that extended below the frame.

=== Third Series ===
The Third Series ran from 1973 to 1986. A new shroud extended down from the barrel, enclosing and protecting the ejector rod, and the front sight was changed to a full ramp. New, oversize wood gripstocks were introduced that covered the front frame strap.

The Third Series featured improvements to the revolver's internal lockwork as well. As with the previous two Series models, a few nickel-plated guns were produced, and a 3-inch (76 mm) barrel variant was again offered. In 1986, facing stagnant sales numbers as well as rising production and labor costs, Colt discontinued production of the Detective Special.

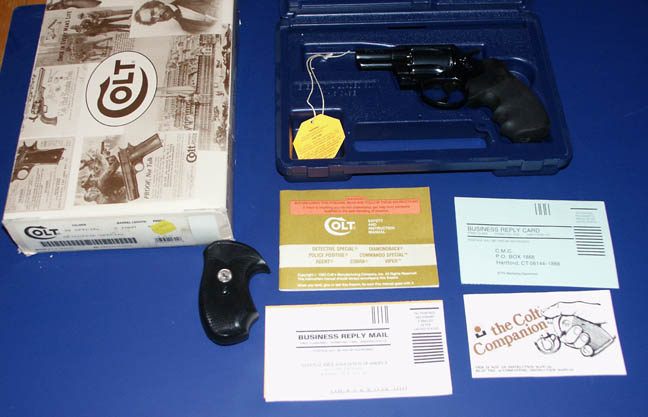
New Colt Detective Special in factory box with manual and extra grip

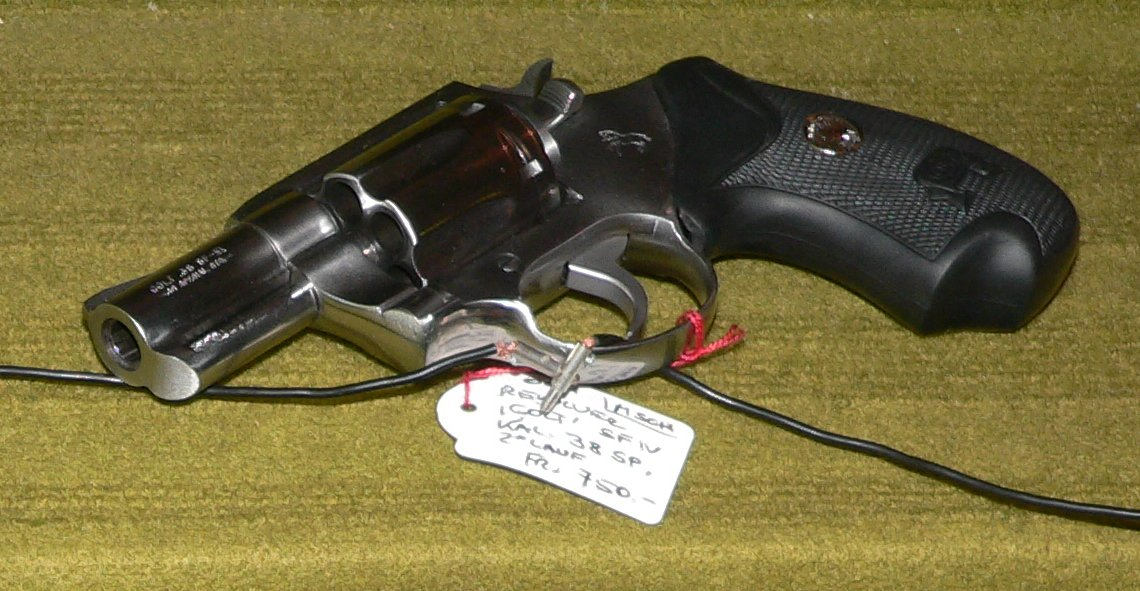
Colt stainless-steel SF-VI

Colt filed for bankruptcy protection in 1992. After reorganization, the company restarted production of the Detective Special in 1992 with its final series.

=== Fourth Series ===
The post-1991 Detective Special is sometimes called the Fourth Series, which ran from 1992 to 1996 and featured "composite" (rubber) wrap-around grips with a gold medallion. Only a 2-inch (51 mm) barrel was offered, in blue or hard chrome finish. The new production run continued only until 1996, when Colt introduced its stainless-steel SF-VI as a replacement for the Detective Special.

=== SF-VI/DS-II ===
In 1997, Colt released the SF-VI/DS-II (Small Frame, 6 Round/Detective Special 2) is a Detective Special with a stainless steel frame and simplified for easier manufacturing in both .38 Special and .357 Magnum.

In 1999, the .357 Magnum version of the SF-VI/DS-II was renamed the Colt Magnum Carry, this model was only produced for a year before the entire production of Colt revolvers (excluding the Colt Python) ceased in 2000, ultimately ending the DS line.

=== Safety ===
From its introduction, the Detective Special used Colt's Positive Safety Lock (hammer block), first featured on the Police Positive.

The mechanism interposes a bar between hammer and frame until the trigger is pulled, preventing accidental discharge if the hammer is struck (e.g., if a dropped gun falls onto its hammer) with the trigger forward.

=== Calibers and finishes ===
The Detective Special was initially available in both bright blued and nickel finishes; a stainless steel finish replaced the nickeled option during the Fourth Series. For the Second Series, caliber options were .32 New Police, .38 New Police, and .38 Special; only .38 Special was offered for the other Series models.

The standard barrel length was 2-inch (51 mm), but also a rare 3-inch (76 mm) barrel was offered during the Second and Third Series.

=== Ammunition ===
Interest has arisen over the use of .38 Special +P ammunition in the Detective Special.

In their more recent owners manuals, Colt authorized limited use of +P ammunition in steel-framed revolvers (including earlier versions) and after firing 2,000 to 3,000 rounds it is recommended that the firearm should be returned to the factory for a safety inspection.

Many believe that this was due to potential liability rather than engineering requirements, as the standard pressure ammunition of previous decades was about the same chamber pressure as modern +P ammunition.

SAAMI lowered the pressures in 1972.

== Variants ==
=== Banker's Special ===
One early variant based on the DS frame was the Colt Banker's Special.

First produced in 1928, it was chambered in .38 Colt New Police (.38 S&W) and .22 Long Rifle. Few were made, particularly in .22LR caliber.

The Banker's Special was popular with railway clerks, who often carried them on mail and parcel freight trains prior to World War II.

During World War II, production was discontinued, and the type was not revived following the war's end. Total production of 35,000 included a few hundred guns with spurless hammers.

=== Commando Special ===
The Colt Commando Special was a version of the Detective Special with a matte finish and rubber grips; produced from 1984 to 1986, it was chambered in .38 Special and weighed 21.5 oz (610 g).

=== DAO Detective Special ===
During the Fourth Series production run of 1992 to 1996, Colt offered the Detective Special with an optional de-spurred 'bobbed' hammer and double action only lockwork, direct from the factory.

The DAO or 'Bobbed Hammer' Detective Special was otherwise the same as the standard Fourth Series Detective Special.

== Legacy ==
=== Design ===
Introduced in 1927, the Detective Special was the first short-barreled revolver produced with a modern swing-out frame.

It was designed from the outset to be chambered for higher-powered cartridges such as the .38 Special, considered to be a powerful caliber for a concealable pocket revolver of the day.

=== Usage ===
Due to the good concealment qualities of the revolver, the Colt Detective Special was used as a weapon mostly by plainclothes police detectives, though it was also a popular off duty and backup firearm for uniformed police officers.

The Colt Detective Special was a popular weapon before the semi-automatic pistol replaced the revolver in many police departments, government agencies, and militaries.

=== Collection ===
First and early Second Series Detective Specials are becoming sought after by collectors, particularly if they are in prime condition and still have the Colt "Royal Blue" finish.

== Users ==
- Iran
- Macau
  - Public Security Police Force
- Myanmar
- South Korea

=== Former users ===
- Hong Kong
  - Hong Kong Police Force
- Indonesia
  - US Military Assistance Program 604 in 1978
- Japan
  - Japanese Self-Defense Forces
  - Tokyo Metropolitan Police Department
- United States
  - Baltimore City Police Department
  - New York Police Department
  - Los Angeles Police Department
  - Boston Police Department
  - Federal Bureau of Investigation
  - United States Armed Forces

== See also ==
- Colt Cobra
- Colt Agent
- Smith & Wesson Model 36
