= .460 S&W Magnum =

Revolver cartridge designed by Smith & Wesson (S&W)

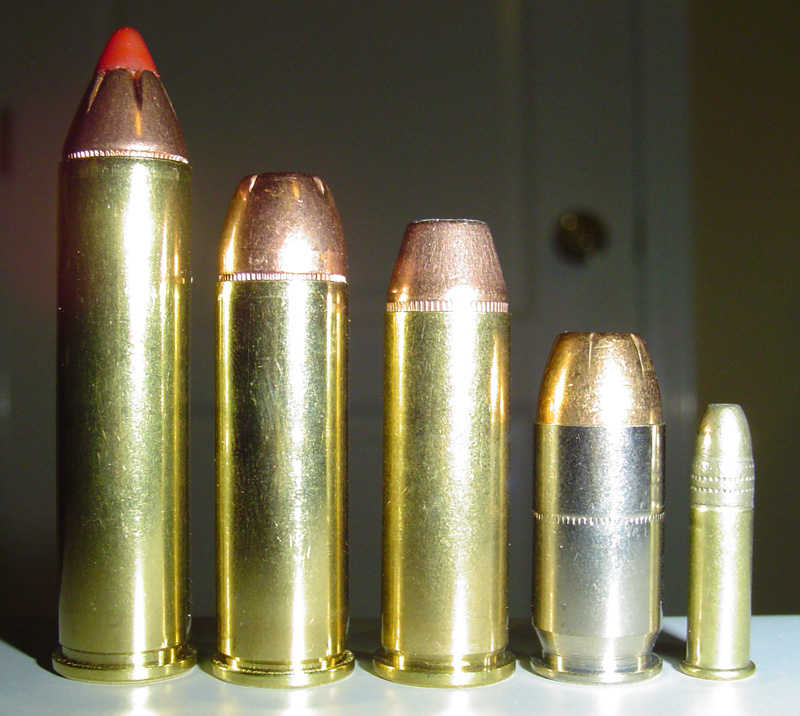
- Left to right: .460 S&W Magnum, .454 Casull, .44 Magnum, .45 ACP, .22LR
- Type: Handgun
- Place of origin: United States

Production history
- Designer: Hornady / Smith & Wesson
- Designed: 2005
- Produced: 2005–present

Specifications
- Parent case: .454 Casull
- Case type: Rimmed, straight
- Bullet diameter: .452 in (11.5 mm)
- Neck diameter: .478 in (12.1 mm)
- Base diameter: .478 in (12.1 mm)
- Rim diameter: .520 in (13.2 mm)
- Rim thickness: .059 in (1.5 mm)
- Case length: 1.80 in (46 mm)
- Overall length: 2.300 in (58.4 mm)
- Primer type: Large rifle
- Maximum pressure: 65,000 psi (450 MPa)

Ballistic performance
Bullet mass/type	Velocity	Energy
200 gr (13 g) DPX Cor-Bon	2,300 ft/s (700 m/s)	2,350 ft⋅lbf (3,190 J)
260 gr (17 g) PG Winchester	2,000 ft/s (610 m/s)	2,309 ft⋅lbf (3,131 J)
300 gr (19 g) JFN Buffalo Bore	2,060 ft/s (630 m/s)	2,826 ft⋅lbf (3,832 J)
360 gr (23 g) LLFN Buffalo Bore	1,900 ft/s (580 m/s)	2,885 ft⋅lbf (3,912 J)
395 gr (26 g) HC Cor-Bon	1,525 ft/s (465 m/s)	2,040 ft⋅lbf (2,770 J)
- Test barrel length: 8.375 inches Sources: Corbon Ammo, Cartridges of the World, Buffalo Bore

The .460 S&W Magnum (11.5×46) round is a powerful revolver cartridge designed for long-range handgun hunting in the Smith & Wesson Model 460 revolver.

== Overview ==
The .460 S&W round is a lengthened, more powerful version of the popular .454 Casull, itself a longer and more powerful version of the .45 Colt. For this reason, the .460 S&W Magnum can be considered an example of a "super magnum". Consequently, firearms that fire .460 S&W are usually capable of firing the less powerful .454 Casull, .45 Colt, and .45 Schofield rounds, but this must be verified with each firearm's manufacturer (most lever-action firearms can only feed cartridges within a certain overall length and bullet profile range). The reverse, however, does not apply: .45 Schofield, .45 Colt, and .454 Casull handguns cannot safely fire .460 S&W rounds — nor can they chamber the .460 S&W because of the longer case length.

== Performance ==
Smith & Wesson claims that the .460 S&W is the highest-velocity revolver cartridge in the world. It propels 200-grain (13 gram) bullets at 2,409 feet per second (734 m/s) from a 10.743-inch (273 mm) test barrel, 2,546.3 ft/s (776 m/s) from a 14-inch (356 mm) Smith & Wesson revolver, 2,656.8 ft/s (810 m/s) from a 10-inch (254 mm) BFR revolver, or 2,323.4 ft/s (708 m/s) from an 8 3/8-inch (213 mm) Smith & Wesson revolver. However, the .500 Bushwhacker cartridge can generate 3,004.6 ft/s (916 m/s) with a 230-grain bullet from a 14-inch (356 mm) revolver.

The .460 cartridge achieves high velocities by combining light-for-caliber bullets, a large case capacity, and the high chamber pressures (65,000 psi maximum) typical of magnum rifle cartridges. At the same time, the recoil when shooting .45 Colt ammunition out of the Smith & Wesson Model 460 is comparable to recoil from a 9mm or .380 load, due to the significantly lower power generated by this cartridge. With Buffalo Bore's loadings, the .460 S&W can achieve 2,826 ft⋅lbf (3,832 J) of energy by driving a 300 grain .452 caliber bullet at 2,060 ft/s (630 m/s) and 2,885 ft⋅lbf (3,912 J) of energy by driving a heavier, 360 grain, .452 caliber bullet at 1,900 ft/s (580 m/s). For comparison, Hornady's 9249 load for the .500 S&W Magnum cartridge offers slightly less energy at the muzzle, achieving 2,868 ft⋅lbf (3,888 J) by driving a 300 grain (19 g) FTX bullet at 2,075 ft/s (632 m/s). Buffalo Bore's loading for the .500 S&W cartridge offers much less energy at the muzzle, achieving only 2,579 ft⋅lbf (3,497 J) by driving a 440 grain .500 caliber bullet at 1,625 ft/s (495 m/s). However, the claimed muzzle energies of ammunition manufacturers may not be realized in real-world firearms, due to differences in forcing cone design, cylinder gap width, and barrel length.

== Long guns ==
Big Horn Armory's Model 90 lever-action is currently the only repeating rifle chambered in the .460 S&W, though a rimless variant of the cartridge, the .45 Raptor, has been developed for semi-automatic applications. The .460 S&W typically generates additional velocity from long guns, which flattens the trajectory and increases muzzle energy. The Ruger No. 1 single-shot rifle was once offered in .460 S&W, as well as the Thompson Center Encore Pro Hunter Katahdin single-shot rifle.

== See also ==
- 11 mm caliber – Firearm cartridge classification
- .45 Raptor
- List of handgun cartridges
- Table of handgun and rifle cartridges – Small arms cartridge data
