= Smith & Wesson Model 625 =

S&W Model 625
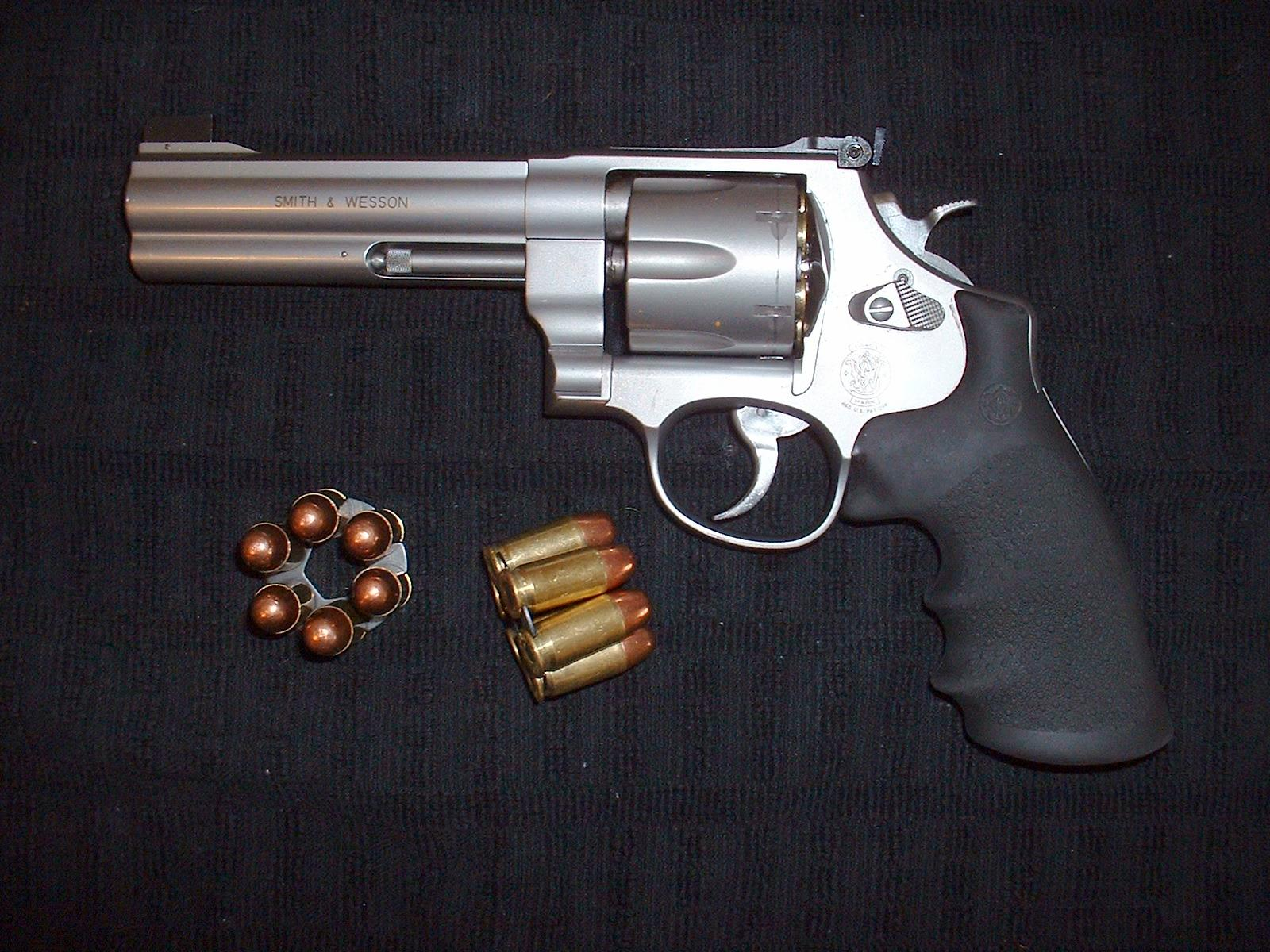
- 625 Revolver with .45 ACP ammunition in moon clips
- Type: Revolver
- Place of origin: United States

Production history
- Designed: 1988
- Variants: 625 Mountain Gun (45 Colt), Round Butt and Square Butt

Specifications
- Barrel length: 4 in (102 mm) and 5 in (127 mm)
- Cartridge: .45 ACP; .45 Auto Rim; .45 Colt
- Caliber: .45 (.451)
- Action: Double action
- Muzzle velocity: 800 ft/s (240 m/s)
- Feed system: Six-round cylinder

The Smith & Wesson Model 625, was a six-round, double-action revolver chambered for the .45 ACP using moon clips. The Model 625 was an improved stainless steel version Smith & Wesson Model 22 and a direct descendant of the Smith & Wesson M1917 revolver first issued during World War I.

== Design ==
Based on Smith & Wesson's stainless steel N frame (large) revolver, the Model 625 was introduced as the .45 cal Model of 1988. It was equipped with a five-inch barrel with a full-length underlug. The regular production model of the Model 625 was introduced in 1989. It was also made with three-inch and four-inch barrels. Standard offerings later only included the four-inch and five-inch barrels.

The S&W Model 625 Mountain Gun was a lightweight version of the 625, with a shortened underlug and tapered barrel, and "Mountain Gun" etched on one side of the barrel. The standard Model 625 Mountain Gun fired .45 Colt through a 4-inch (102 mm) barrel. In 2001, a limited edition was also built by the Smith & Wesson Performance Center that used .45 ACP ammunition. Both of these revolvers had adjustable rear sights and Hogue rubber grips.

The Model 625-10 was the newest version of this revolver from the Smith & Wesson Performance Center, introduced in 2004. It was a snubnosed revolver version of the 625. The S&W Model 625-10 was a stainless steel update of the M1917 revolver, a popular starting gun for conversion to a "Fitz Special".

Another recent Performance Center version, the S&W Model 625 JM, was introduced in 2005. The "JM" stands for Jerry Miculek, a renowned revolver speed shooter, and was his personal design. The Model 625 JM used a 4-inch (102 mm) barrel with rear adjustable sights and a front gold bead black patridge sight. The Model 625 JM was finished in matte bead-blasted stainless steel. The grips were Miculek's design.

Another .45 ACP revolver from Smith & Wesson was the Model 325 Night Guard. It was similar to the 625–10 in that the frame was an aluminum-scandium blend. It had a similar grooved rear sight as the 625–10, but the front sight of the 325 Night Guard was a tritium night sight. The model 325 had a matte black finish. The Model 325 Night Guard has been discontinued.

An additional Smith & Wesson .45 ACP revolver was the Model 325 Thunder Ranch, which had a 4-inch barrel and an accessory rail for mounting lights and lasers.

The Model 625 in .45 ACP was the revolver used by Jerry Miculek when he set the world record for the fastest six shots, a reload, and another six shots in 2.99 seconds.

== Use of moon clips ==
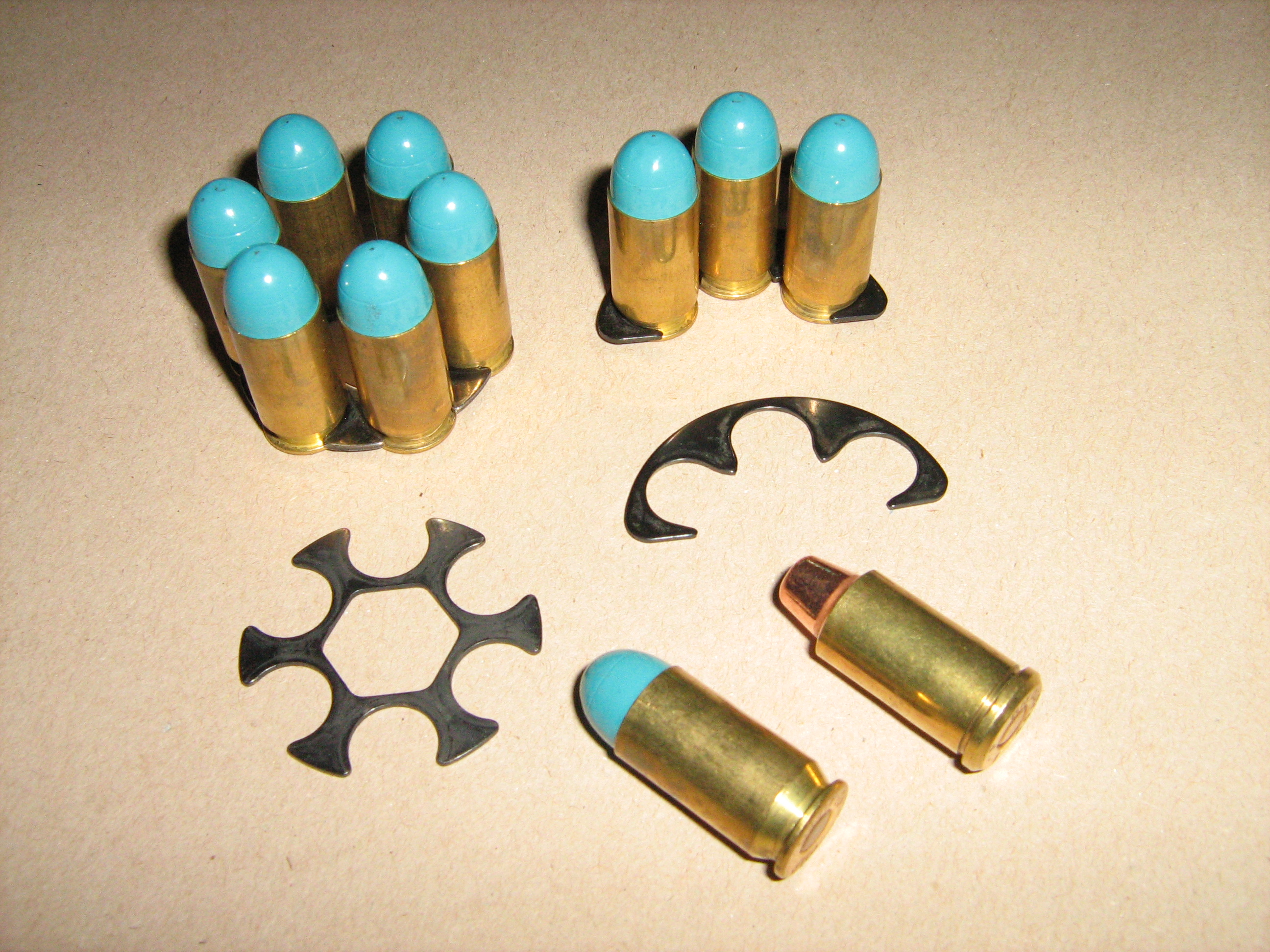
Full and half moon clips loaded with .45 ACP and one Truncated Cone .45 Auto Rim cartridges.

The Model 625 was designed to fire .45 ACP pistol cartridges with use with moon clips. It also head-spaced the .45 ACP cartridge in the chambers without use of moon clips, but since the extractor could not engage the rimless cartridge, the empty shells had to be ejected with a cleaning rod or pencil. It could also use .45 Auto Rim as they were designed for revolvers chambered in .45 ACP using moon clips.

== Variants of the 625 ==
- S&W Model 625 (.45 Colt Target Stainless)
- S&W Model 625 Mountain Gun (Model of 1989 .45 Light Weight 39.5 oz (1.1 kg))
- S&W Model 625-2 .45 ACP
- S&W Model 625-3 .45 ACP
- S&W Model 625-4 .45 ACP
- S&W Model 625-5 .45 Colt
- S&W Model 625-6 and -9 Mountain Gun (-6: .45 ACP, -9: .45 Colt)
- S&W Model 625-7 .45 Colt
- S&W Model 625-8 .45 ACP
- S&W Model 625-9 .45 Colt
- S&W Model 625-10 .45 ACP Scandium Frame Performance Center
- S&W Model 625-11 .45 Colt Scandium Frame Performance Center
- S&W Model 625 JM (Jerry Miculek design)
- S&W Model 625-6 V-Comp .45 ACP (Performance Center)

== Gallery ==
Early, 1988 marked model

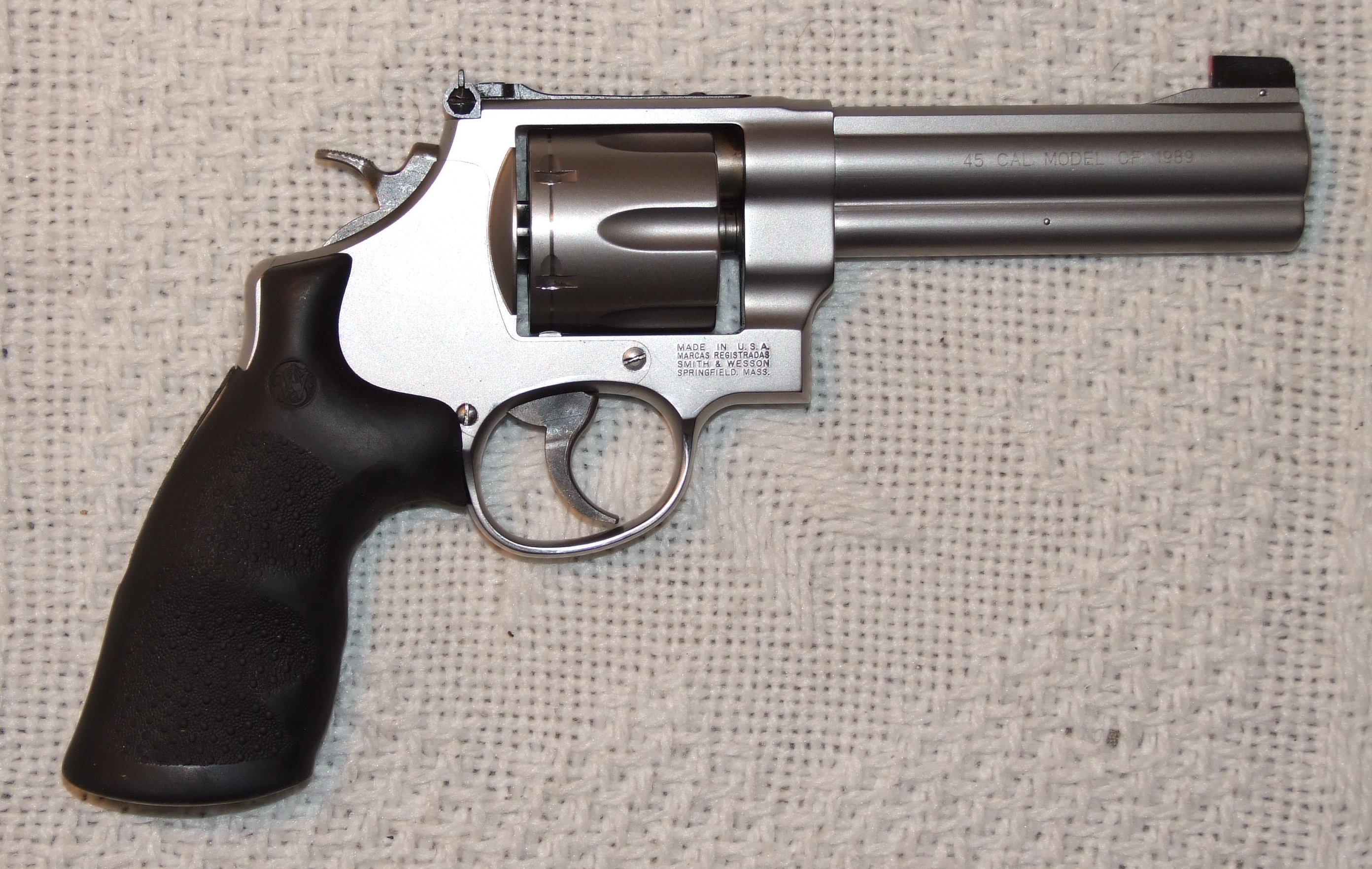
Right side view

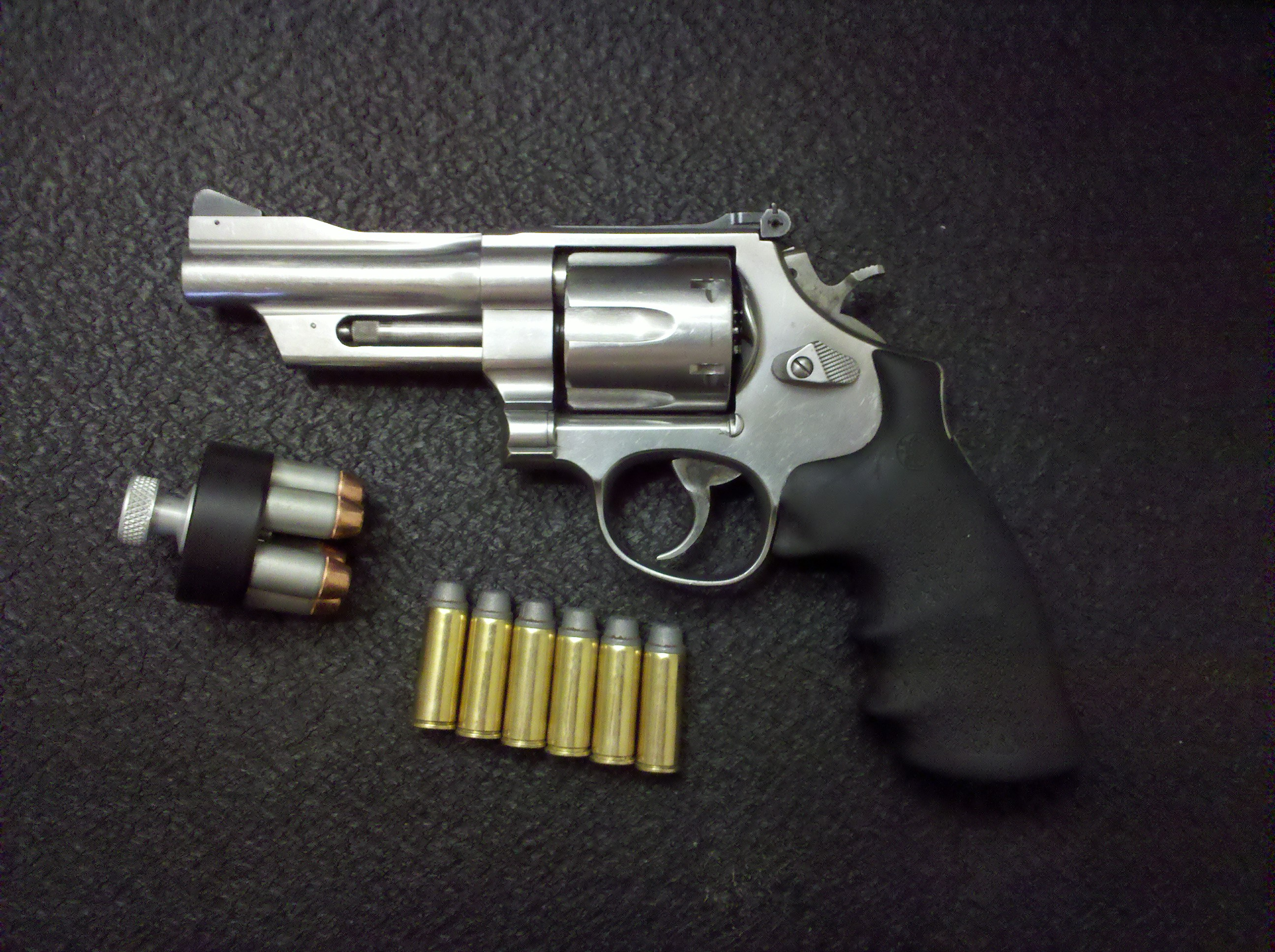
Left side view of a S&W Mountain Gun M625-6 .45 LC revolver, 4" barrel, with 250 gr. .45 Colt cartridges and a speedloader filled with home defense 250 gr. Underwood XTP

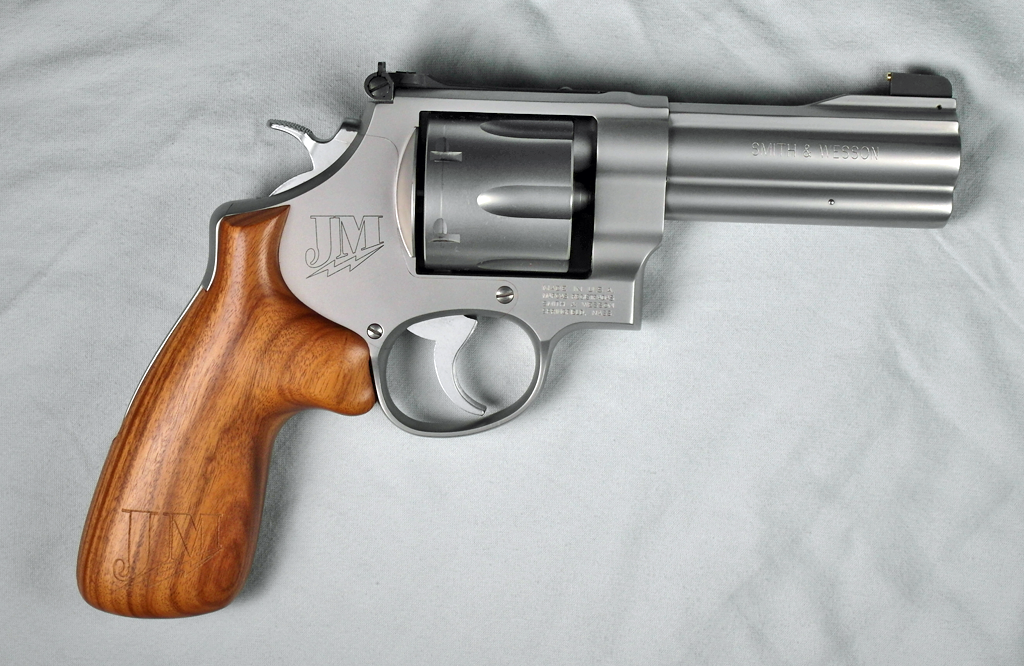
Smith & Wesson Model 625 JM

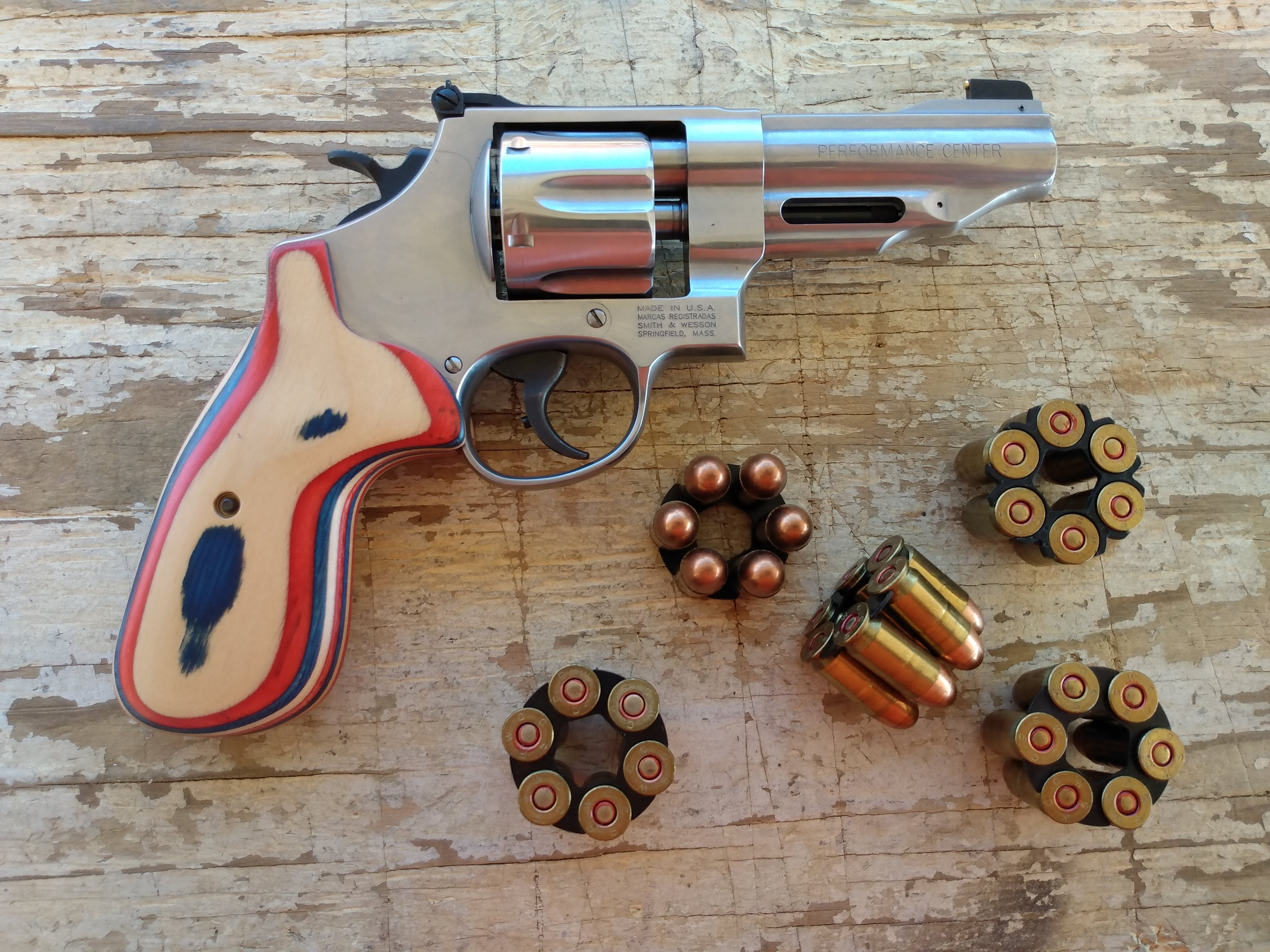
Smith & Wesson Performance Center Model 625–8, with .45 ACP ammunition loaded into moon clips

Smith & Wesson 325PD AirLight
