= Smith & Wesson Model 22 =

Revolver

S&W Model 22/25
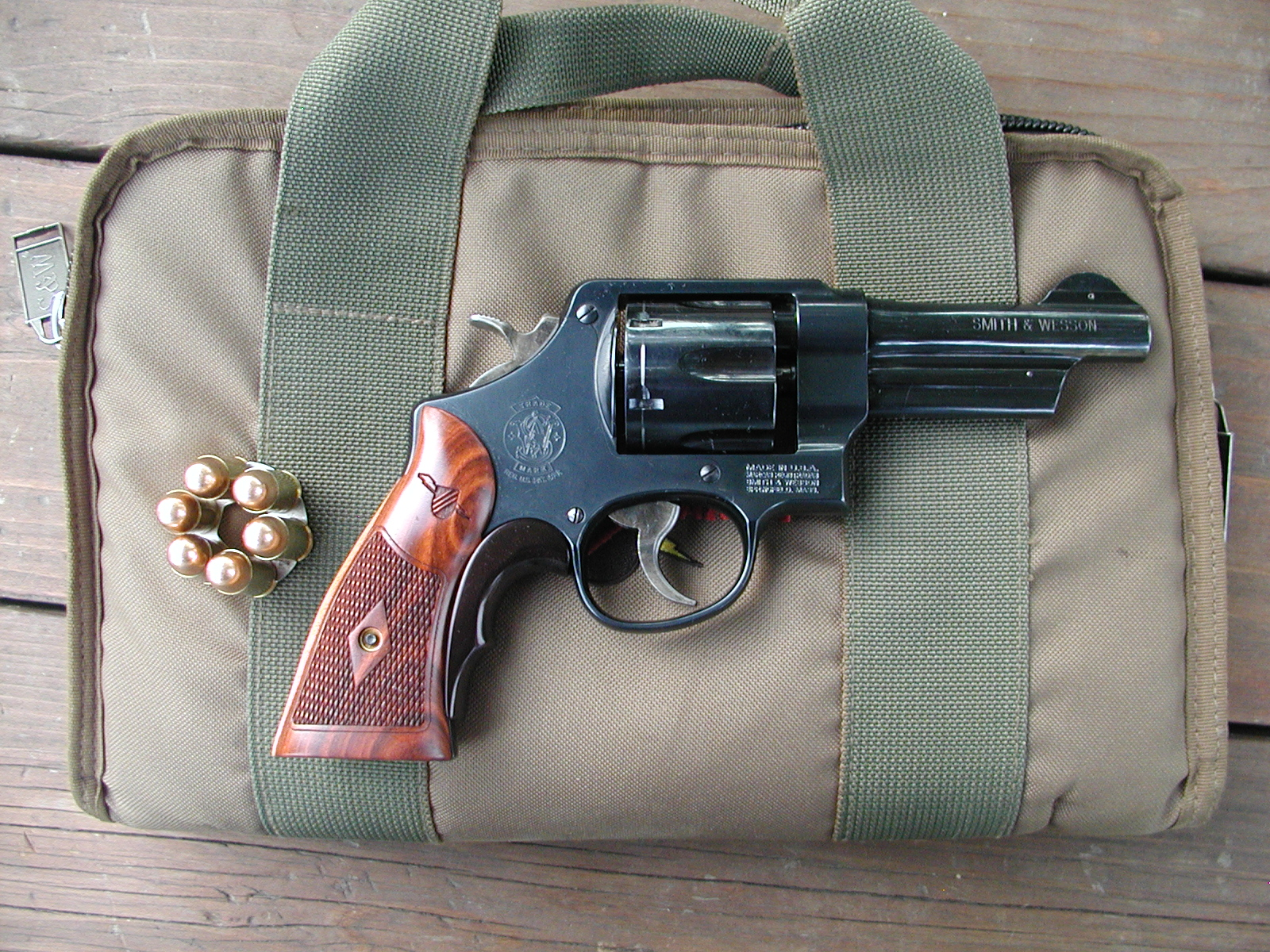
- A S&W Model 22 Thunder Ranch Revolver with a Tyler "T" Grip installed
- Type: Revolver
- Place of origin: United States

Production history
- Designed: 1917
- Manufacturer: Smith & Wesson
- Produced: 1950 through 2007 2026 to Present

Specifications
- Mass: 2.25 lb (1.0 kg)
- Length: 10.8 in (270 mm)
- Barrel length: 5.5 in (140 mm)
- Cartridge: .45 ACP (11.43×23mm), .45 Auto Rim (11.43×23mmR), 45 Colt (11.43×33mmR)
- Action: Double action, solid frame with swing-out cylinder
- Muzzle velocity: 760 ft/s (231.7 m/s)
- Feed system: Six-round cylinder, loaded singly or with two three-round half-moon clips
- Sights: Blade front sight, notched rear sight

The Smith & Wesson Model 22 is a six-shot, double-action, large frame revolver chambered in .45 ACP using moon clips. It is a refined commercial version of the M1917 revolver first issued during World War I.

== Additional ==
Built around Smith & Wesson's large N frame, it was originally sold as the Model 1950 and is normally fitted with a 5½" barrel with no under lug and fixed combat sights. The Models 25 and Model 26 are the "Target" models. The Model 22 was succeeded by the stainless steel Smith & Wesson Model 625.

The Model 22 was re-introduced as the second limited production Thunder Ranch revolver in 2007. This gun features a 4" match barrel with under lug, fixed sights, cocobolo grips, and an internal lock. The popularity of this revolver led S&W to continue its production in its classic line as the 22-4. It is quite an accurate revolver and has a smoother trigger pull than the original, most likely due to improvements in production. A limited production run of bright nickel-plated, non–Thunder Ranch models were made. Only select firearm dealers were considered to be allowed to sell this particular model. A certain number of Model 22s were made with a case-hardened (case color) finish by Turnbull Restorations. These came in both 4" and (limited) 5½" Barrel lengths. The finish done by Turnbull is a true case-hardened finish and not the chemical wash finish found on firearms by other manufacturers.

== Use of moon clips ==
The Model 22 was designed to fire .45 ACP pistol cartridges with use with moon clips. It will headspace the .45 ACP cartridge in the chambers without use of moon clips, but since the extractor cannot engage the rimless cartridge, the empty shells must be ejected with a cleaning rod or pencil. It may also use .45 Auto Rim as they were designed for revolvers chambered in .45 ACP using moon clips.

== Gallery ==
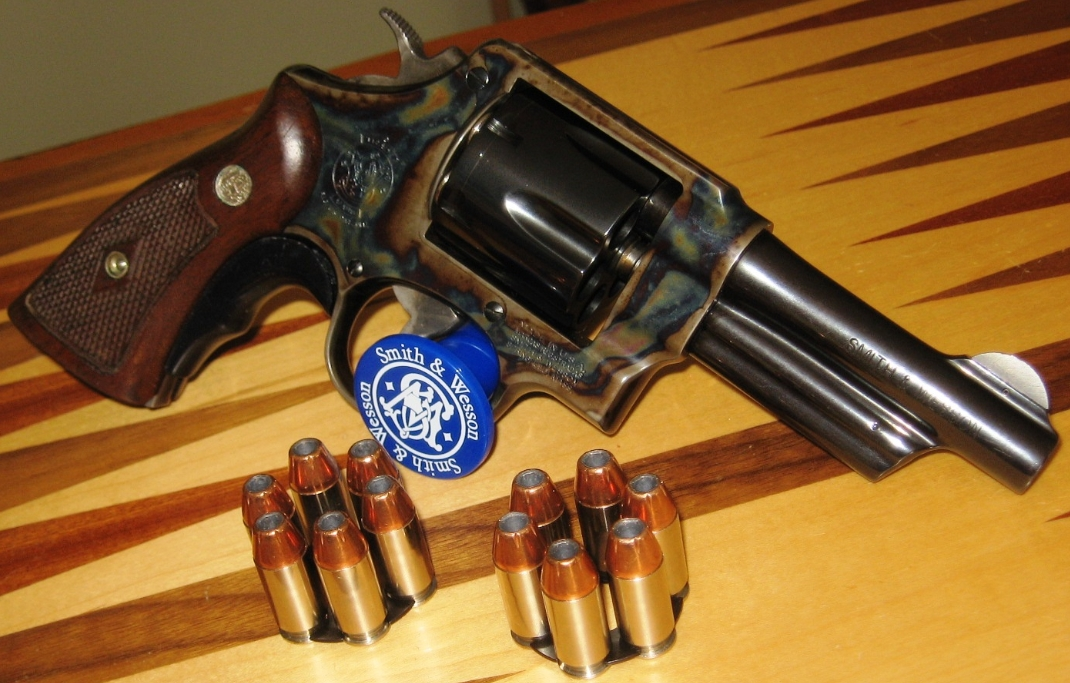
A .45 ACP S&W Model 22—4 Heritage Series with case-hardened finish.

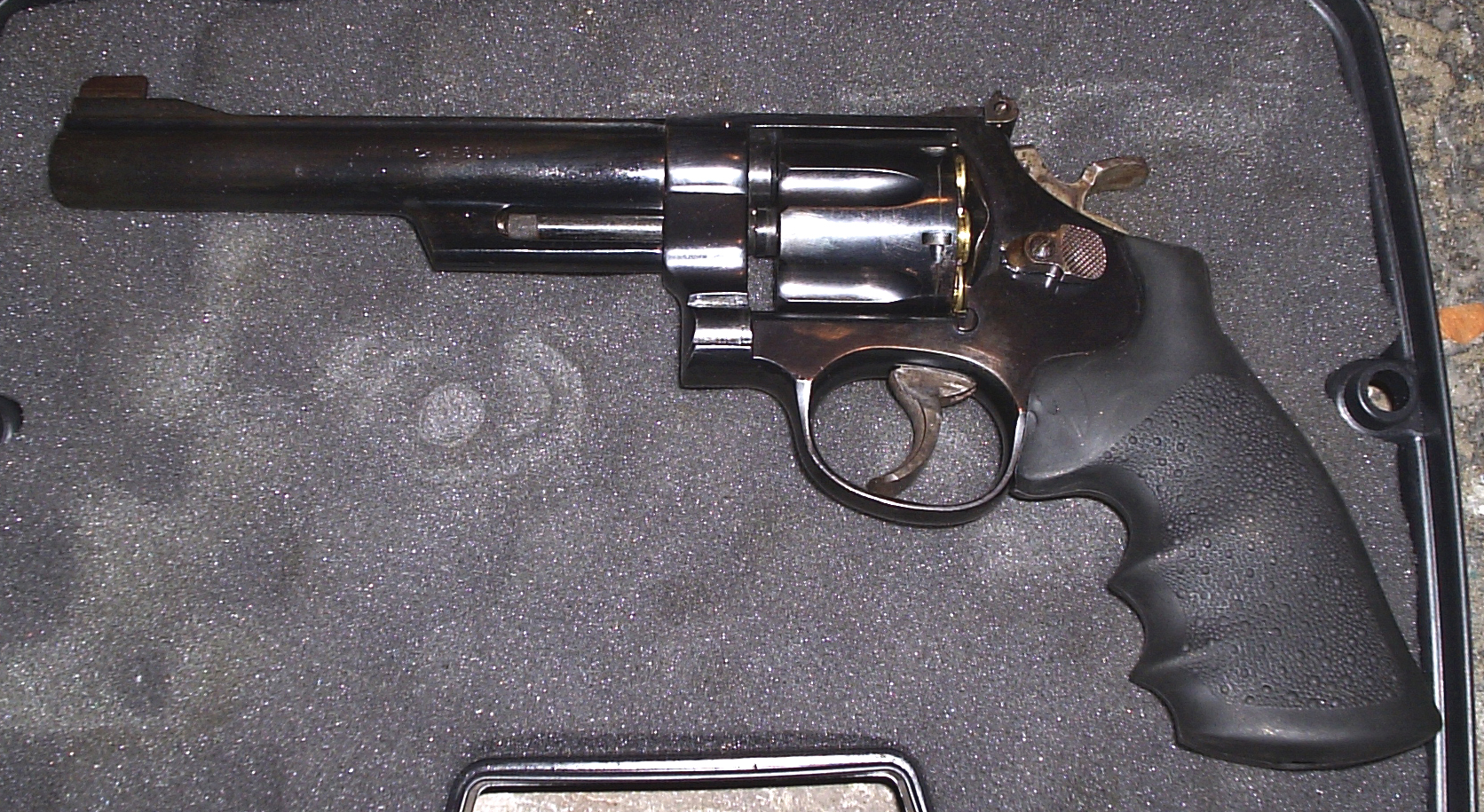
A Model 25—2 in .45 ACP.

A Model 25—2, Target Model of 1955, in .45 ACP.

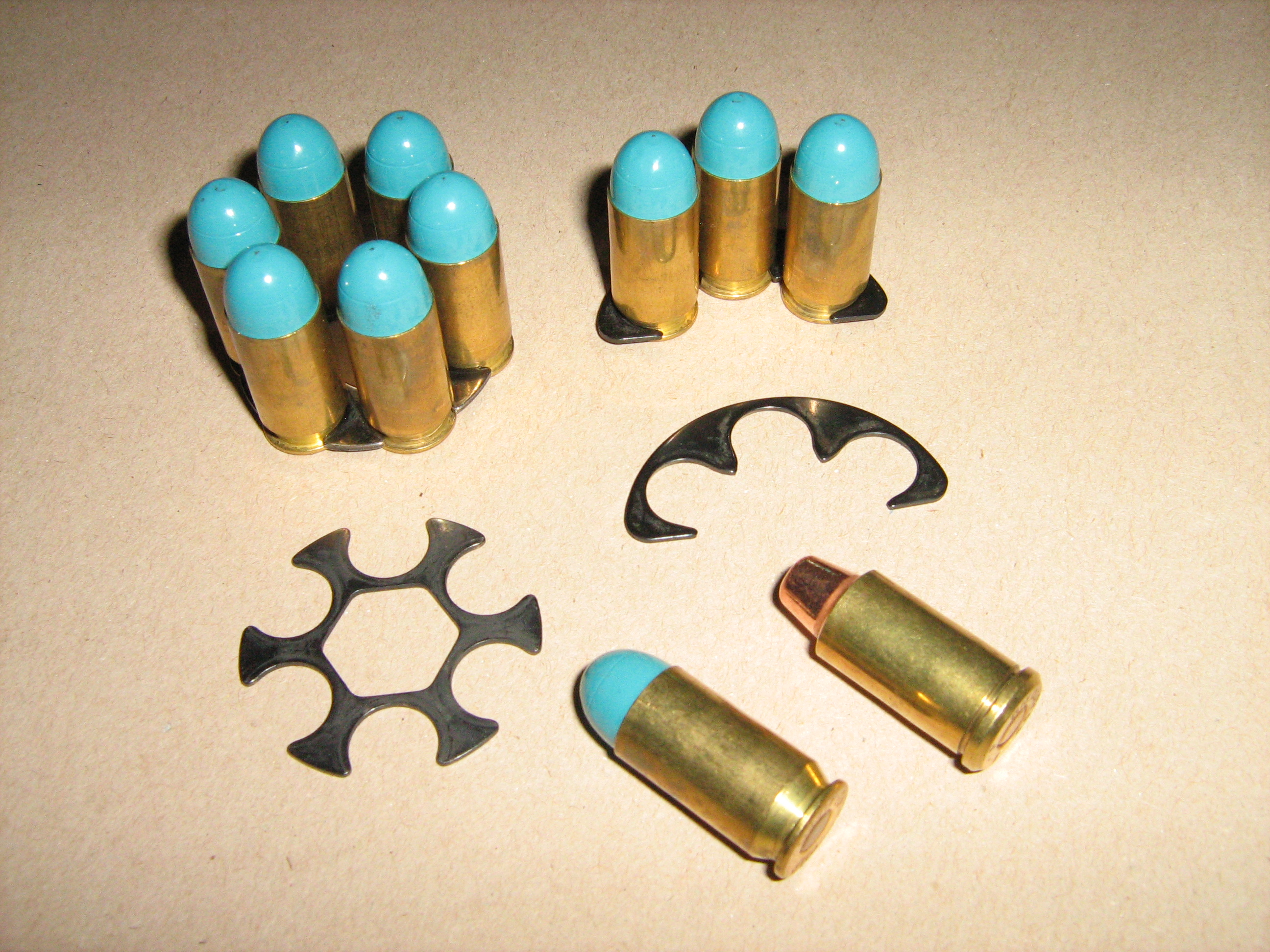
Full and half moon clips loaded with .45 ACP and one Truncated Cone .45 Auto Rim cartridge.
