= Moon clip =

Ring-shaped holder for revolver cartridges

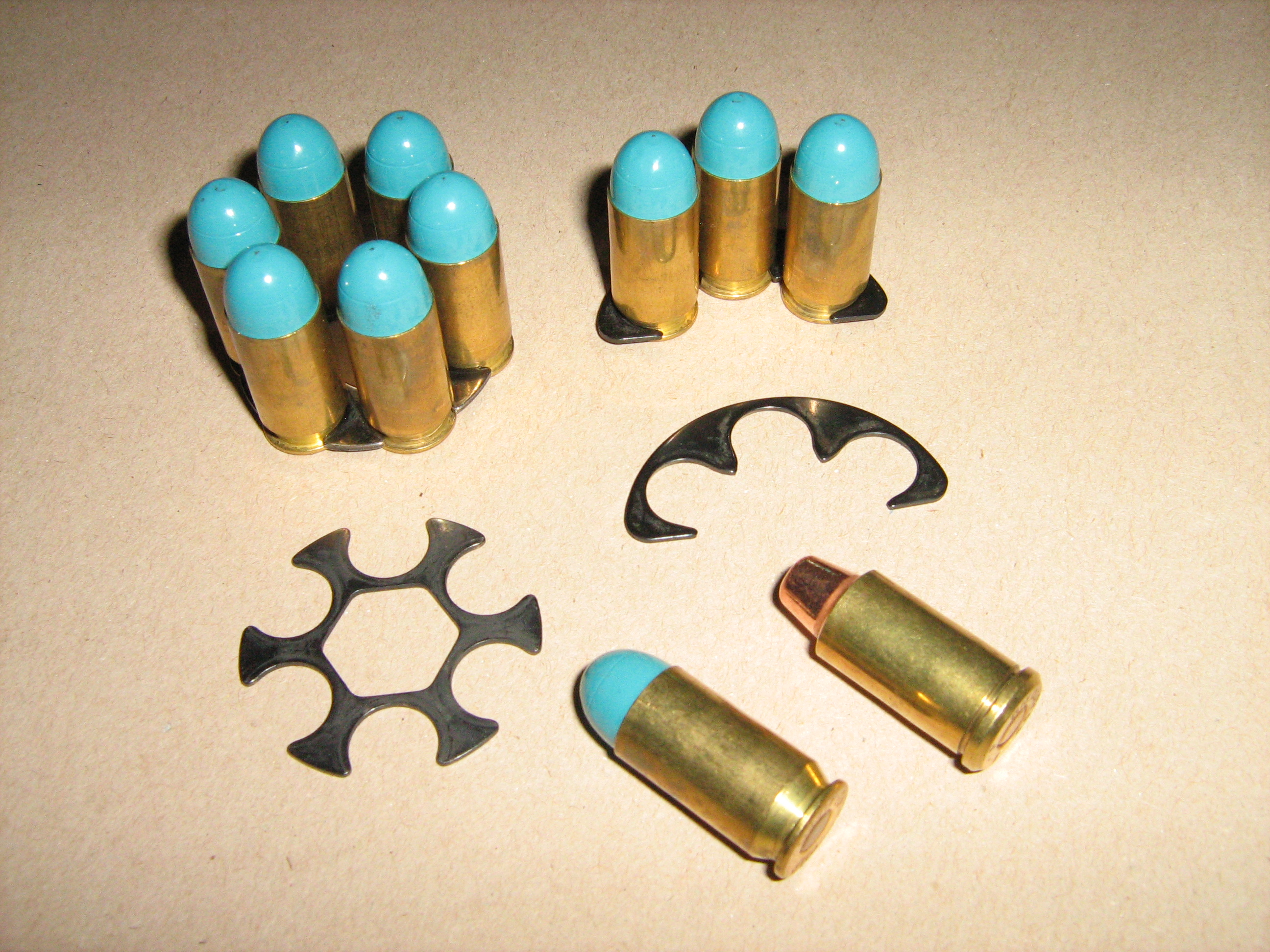
Full and half moon clips loaded with .45 ACP and one Semiwadcutter .45 Auto Rim cartridge.

A moon clip is a ring-shaped or star-shaped piece of metal designed to hold multiple cartridges together as a unit, for simultaneous insertion and extraction from a revolver cylinder. Moon clips may either hold an entire cylinder's worth of cartridges together (full moon clip), half a cylinder (half moon clip), or just two neighboring cartridges. The two-cartridge moon clips can be used for those revolvers that have an odd number of loading chambers such as five or seven and also for those revolvers that allow a shooter to mix both rimless and rimmed types of cartridges in one loading of the same cylinder (e.g., two adjacent rounds of .45 ACP, two rounds of .45 Colt, and two rounds of .410 in a single six-chamber S&W Governor cylinder).

Moon clips can be used either to chamber rimless cartridges in a double-action revolver (which would normally require rimmed cartridges), or to chamber multiple rimmed cartridges simultaneously. Moon clips are generally made from spring grade steel, although plastic versions have also been produced. Unlike a speedloader, a moon clip remains in place during firing, and after firing is used to extract the empty cartridge cases.

== History ==
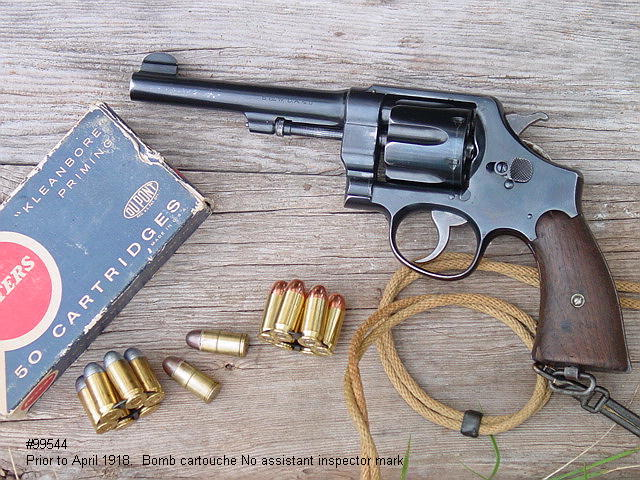
Smith & Wesson 1917 with .45 ACP moon clips and two auto rim cartridges

The modern moon clip was devised shortly before World War I in 1908. The device then became widespread during the war, when the relatively new M1911 semi-automatic pistol could not be manufactured fast enough for the war effort. The U.S. War Department asked Smith & Wesson and Colt to devise ways to use the M1911's .45 ACP rimless cartridge in their revolvers. The result was the M1917 revolver, employing moon clips to chamber the military-issue .45 ACP ammunition. Smith & Wesson invented and patented the half-moon clip, but at the request of the Army allowed Colt to also use the design free of charge in their own version of the M1917 revolver.

However, many civilian shooters disliked and still dislike using moon clips. Although full moon clips allow a revolver to be very quickly reloaded, loading and unloading the clips is tedious, and bent clips can bind the cylinder and cause misfires.

Moon clips can be formed by stamped high-carbon steel, heat treated, and finished to prevent rust. Alternatively they can be made from pre-heat-treated stainless steel and cut out using either wire EDM or laser machinery. They can also be made by injection molding plastic. Each process has its benefits and drawbacks such as cost and durability.

== Speed ==
Moon clips can be even faster to use than a speedloader with the proper training. Jerry Miculek, an IPSC revolver shooter, has demonstrated the ability to fire six rounds from a Smith & Wesson Model 625 .45 ACP revolver, reload, and then fire six more rounds at the 6 in × 11 in (150 mm × 280 mm) A zone of an IPSC target at 15 ft (4.6 m) in 2.99 seconds. This feat was possible by using moon clips to allow quick and reliable ejection of the fired rounds, and a quick reload of all six chambers at once.

== Use ==
Moon clips have been made available for many different calibers including; .30 Carbine, .327 Federal Magnum, .380 ACP, 9mm Luger, .38 Super, .38 S&W, .38 Special, .357 Magnum, .40 S&W, 10mm Auto, .41 Magnum, .44 Special, .44 Magnum, .45 Colt, .454 Casull, .45 ACP, .45 Super, .460 Rowland, and .460 S&W Magnum.

Common revolver models that are manufactured to use moon clips:

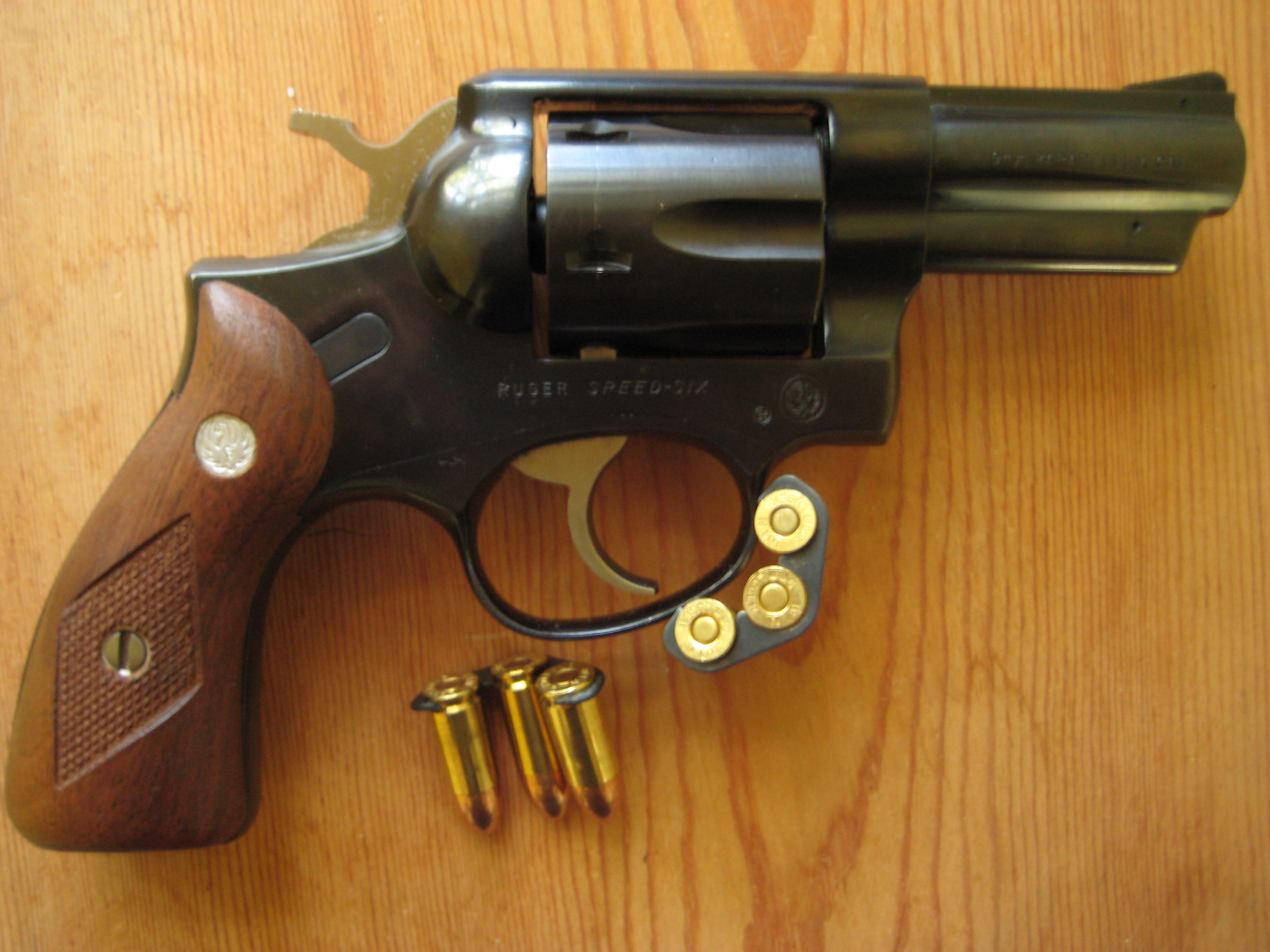
Rare Ruger Speed Six variant in 9mm Parabellum, which uses half-moon clips to chamber the rimless cartridges

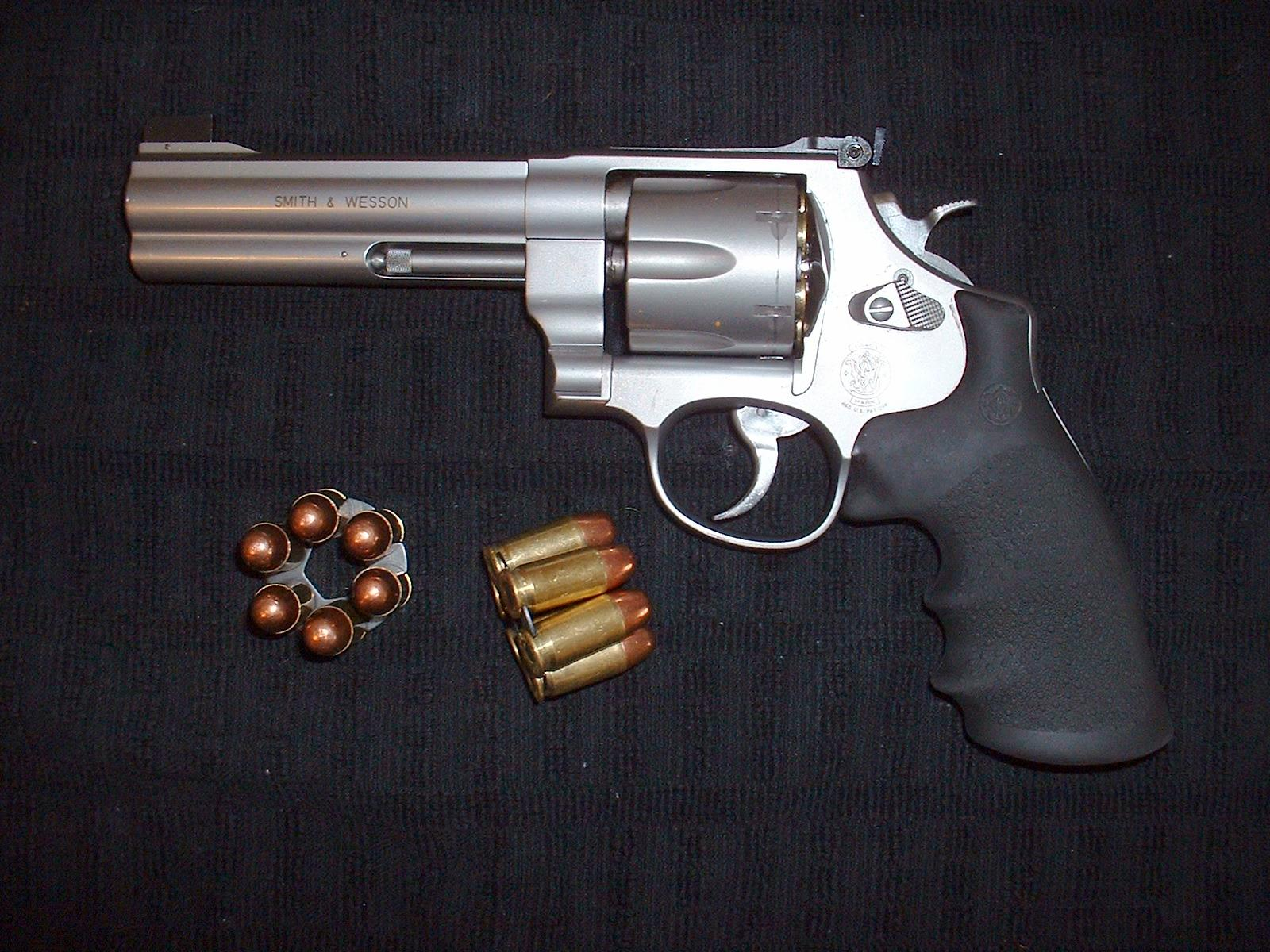
Smith & Wesson Model 625 .45 ACP moon clips.

- 9×17 mm and 9×18mm Makarov
  - OTs-01 Kobalt
  - R-92
- 9mm Luger
  - Charter Arms Pitbull
  - Chiappa Rhino
  - S&W Model 940
  - S&W Model 929
  - S&W Model 986
  - Ruger LCR
  - Ruger SP101
  - Ruger Speed-Six
  - Taurus Model 905
  - Alfa Proj. 9200 series
- 10mm Auto/.40 S&W
  - S&W Model 610
- .40 S&W
  - S&W Model 646
- .45 ACP
  - M1917 revolver
  - Ruger Redhawk
  - S&W Model 22
  - S&W Models 25 (for blue) and 625 (for stainless)
  - S&W Governor
  - Webley revolver (Beginning with the Mark VI, which was British Army standard issue from 1915. Moon clips can also be used to enable .455 Webleys to shoot the .45 ACP cartridge — a common, though dangerous adaptation, as the .45 ACP standard pressure is above maximum pressure ratings for all models of Webley revolver.)
- 7.62×41.5mm SP-4
  - OTs-38 Stechkin
