= Ruger Security-Six =

American revolver

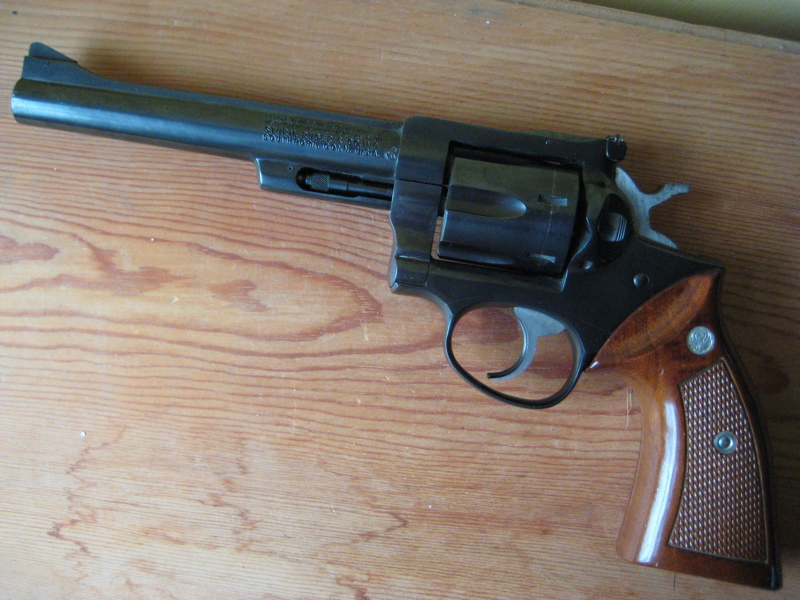
- Ruger Security-Six in .357 Magnum
- Type: Revolver
- Place of origin: United States

Service history
- In service: 1972 – Present

Production history
- Manufacturer: Sturm, Ruger
- Produced: 1972–1988
- No. built: 1,240,000~1,500,000
- Variants: Service-Six; Speed-Six

Specifications
- Mass: 33.5 oz (4 inch barrel)
- Barrel length: 2.75 inch (70mm); 3 inch (76 mm); 4 inch (102 mm); 6 inch (152 mm)
- Cartridge: .38 S&W; .38 Special; .357 Magnum; 9×19mm Parabellum (9mm Luger)
- Action: Double action/Single action
- Feed system: Six round cylinder
- Sights: Fixed and adjustable iron open

The Ruger Security-Six and its variants, the Service-Six and Speed-Six are a product line of double-action revolvers introduced in 1972 and manufactured until 1988 by Sturm, Ruger & Co. These revolvers were marketed to law enforcement duty issue, military, and civilian self-defense markets.

== Development and history ==
As far back as 1966, Ruger designers Harry Sefried and Henry Into began working on the company's first double-action revolver. Despite being popular with civilians, founder Bill Ruger hoped to expand into the law enforcement and private security markets, which were then dominated by rivals Smith & Wesson and Colt. The introduction of the Security-Six and its variants marked Sturm Ruger's first attempt to sell a custom double-action revolver, deviating from the corporation's earlier designs which were outdated Colt Peacemaker-style single-action revolvers. Ruger used investment casting for most parts in an effort to hold down production costs. As with all Ruger firearms, the Security-Six revolvers were robustly designed with large, heavy-duty parts for durability and to allow for the investment casting process.

Sefried had previously worked for High Standard Manufacturing Company, where he designed the High Standard Sentinel revolver. The grip profile of the Sentinel was reused on the "Six" line. Ruger's new revolvers were unlike other guns on the market in that they used a one-piece frame, rather than a removable sideplate, which lent them superior strength. The Ruger Redhawk, introduced in 1980 and also designed by Sefried, was a scaled-up and improved version of the Security-Six. The "six series" line enjoyed sales success because of their basic features, solid construction, and competitive pricing.

Various models were issued by US government agencies as diverse as the NYPD, the former Immigration and Naturalization Service, the Postal Service, the Border Patrol, and numerous police agencies. The Security-Six and its derivatives also became the standard issue service weapons of a large number of police departments, and many were exported overseas. While Ruger's Security-Six line has been out of production since 1988, a total of over 1.5 million revolvers were produced and they remain well-liked and respected, as well as highly sought after in the second-hand market due to their strength and reliability.

In the early 1980s, Ruger commissioned a heavier duty upgrade of the Six line that could handle a "lifetime diet" of full-powered magnum loads, the GP100, which featured a beefier frame and full under-lug barrel, stronger steels, a redesigned grip frame and, most notably, a triple-locking cylinder to give extra strength to the action. The GP100 replaced the Security-Six in the Ruger product line, but the Six line is still a very strong revolver, popular with shooters and collectors today.

== Features ==
The Security-Six and its variants were more or less identical in basic design, with minor differences in sights (fixed or adjustable) and frame (round or square butt). Although medium-framed in size, the Security-Six was somewhat stronger than competing guns like the Smith & Wesson Model 19 as the Ruger featured a thicker frame without a sideplate cutout, a stronger barrel shank support that prevented catastrophic barrel failure in the six-inch model revolvers, larger, stronger internal parts, and an increased diameter cylinder with offset bolt locking notches. The new revolvers were initially manufactured in a blued carbon steel finish; in 1975 stainless steel versions of all models were added to the lineup. Featuring six-round cylinders, the Security-Six series represented one of the first modern revolver designs to feature a hammer powered by a coil spring utilizing a transfer-bar firing system, and was chambered for a variety of centerfire ammunition cartridges including .38 Special and .357 Magnum, as well as .38 S&W and 9×19mm Parabellum (9mm Luger). All Security-Six series revolvers came with original equipment manufacturer (OEM) supplied service-style wooden grips. The wood grips were all manufactured for Ruger by W.F. Lett Manufacturing in New Hampshire, a now-defunct contractor. Most of these wood grips featured a diamond-shaped panel of pressed checkering, though smooth walnut grips with uncheckered panels were shipped with some commemorative models. Oversized walnut target/combat grips were also available as a factory option. During the 1980s, some of the Speed- and Service-Six models were also shipped with rubber Pachmayr grips containing the silver Ruger emblem.

Another feature of the Security-Six was straightforward disassembly, which required no tools with the exception of a flathead screwdriver, coin, or cartridge case rim used to remove the grip screw.

=== Security-Six ===
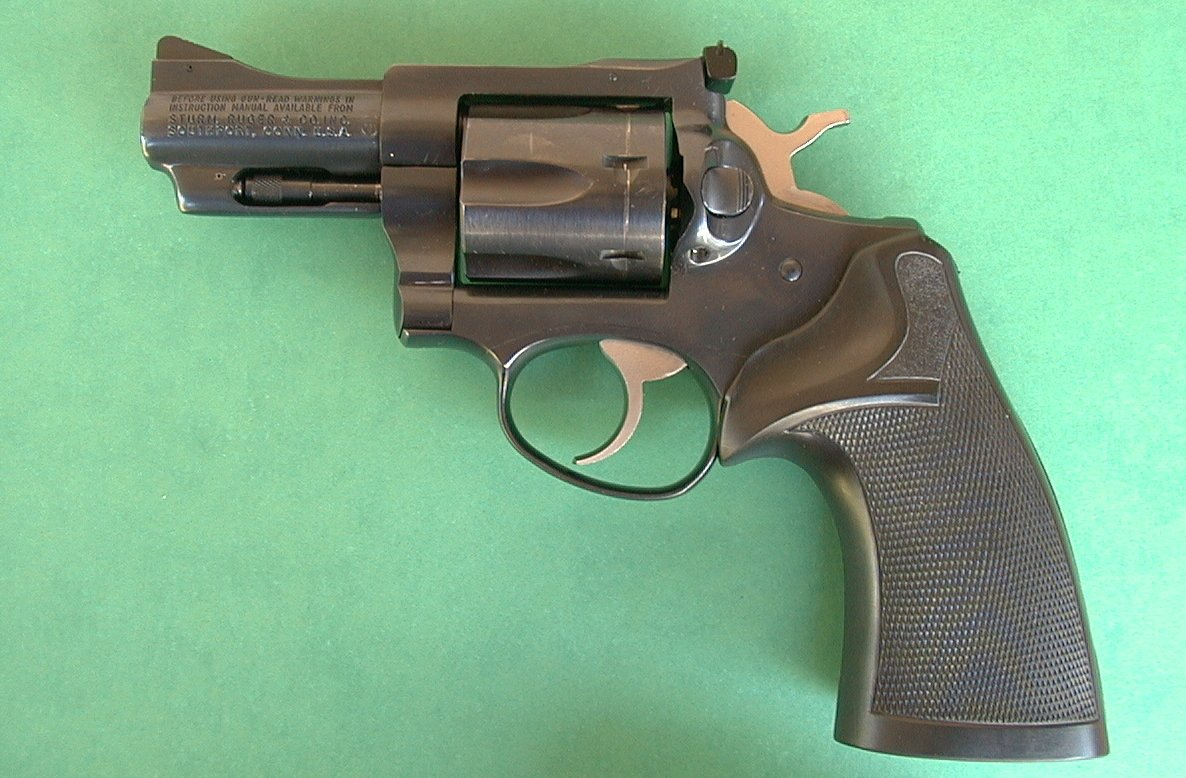
Ruger Security Six with a 2.75 in (70 mm) barrel and rubber grips

Introduced in 1972, the Security-Six was the original model of the new series. The majority of these guns were manufactured with adjustable iron sights, although a few early models were sold with fixed sights. Security-Sixes could be ordered with either service or "target" (combat) -style square butt grips. Nearly all Security-Sixes were chambered for the .357 Magnum cartridge, which also permitted the use of the shorter .38 Special cartridge. Ruger also chambered the Security-Six in .38 Special for some police orders by fitting different cylinders that could only accommodate the .38 Special cartridge. Barrel lengths available on the Security-Six included 2.75, 4, and 6 inches.

=== Service-Six ===
After a few months of production, Ruger renamed the fixed-sight version of the Security-Six the Service-Six or alternatively, the "Police Service-Six". This was largely a marketing decision and an attempt to capitalize on the lucrative law enforcement service revolver market. The Service-Six was normally chambered in .357 Magnum, though Ruger also built versions in .38 Special and 9mm Luger (Parabellum) for some police orders. The U.S. Military contracted for the fixed-sight .38 Special variant adding a lanyard ring to the butt and designating it the M108. It was to replace aging Smith & Wesson Model 10 for issuing to air crews and military police. The 9mm variant featured cylinder chambers bored to headspace the cartridge on the case mouth instead of the rim, using a patented spring moon clip to permit extraction of the fired case. These alterations allowed the rimless 9mm cartridge to be used in a revolver design. Barrel length options for the Service-Six included 2.75 and 4 inches. The 9mm was also marketed under the designation M109.

=== Speed-Six ===
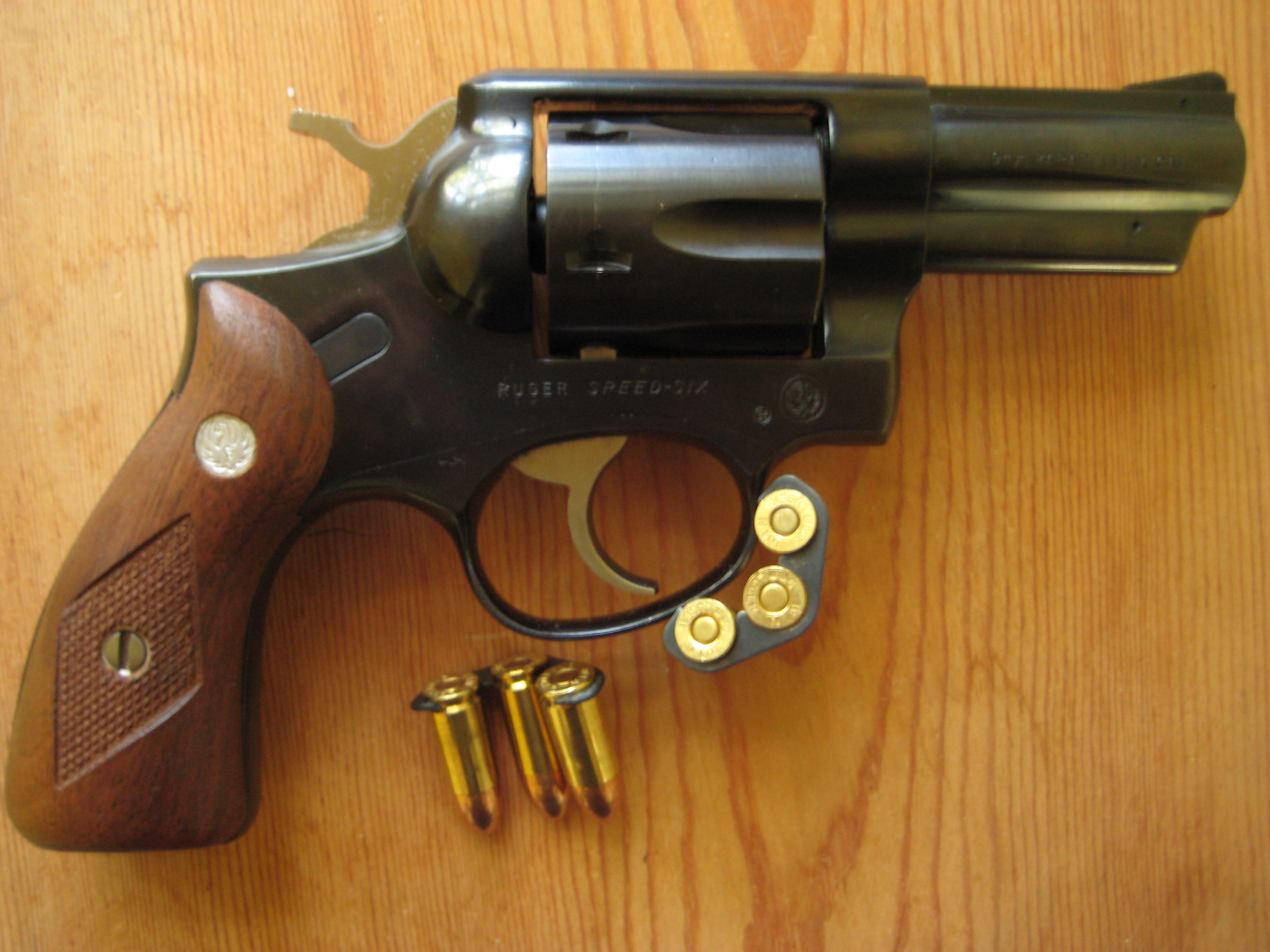
Rare Speed-Six variant in 9mm Parabellum, which uses moon clips to chamber the rimless cartridges

Incorporating fixed sights and a round-butt frame, and available in .357 Magnum, .38 Special, .38 S&W (.38-200), and 9mm Luger, the Speed-Six was intended for use by plainclothes detectives and others desiring a more concealable handgun. The .38 S&W variant (in England known as the .380 British or .38-200) was equipped with a military-style lanyard ring, and was sold to law enforcement organizations in India. The .357 Magnum, two and three quarter inch barreled version was the agency issue sidearm to Special Agents of the former Immigration and Naturalization Service, until the agency adopted a .40 caliber semiautomatic pistol in the mid 1990’s. The .357 Magnum version was standard issue for the Royal Ulster Constabulary, who, unlike most police officers in the United Kingdom, were routinely armed, but was phased out in 2003 and replaced by the Glock 17, with 15 examples continuing to be issued as duty weapons in 2012.

== Users ==
- Australia, Northern Territory Police Force 1979 50 units 4” stainless.
- Canada.
- Colombia.
- India: Ruger Service Six in .38 S&W Purchased ca 1978-79.
- United Arab Emirates: Internal Security Forces
- United Kingdom: Royal Ulster Constabulary.
- United States: US Military designation GS32-N.
  - Immigration and Naturalization Service
  - Montgomery County Police Department (Maryland) Ruger Security Six, Replaced by the Beretta 92D 9mm.
  - Naval Investigative Service M108
  - New York Police Department Ruger Police Service, Ruger Service Six, and Ruger Speed Six, 3 and 4 inch barrel. Service revolver for the NYPD along with the Smith & Wesson Model 10 until replaced with semiautomatics in 1993, and completely phased out in 2018.
  - New Jersey State Police Ruger Security Six 4 inch .357 magnum revolver (GA-34) with 30 rounds of Winchester-Western, 110 grain, .38 Special +P JHP rounds for their revolvers, in a pair of cartridge loops mounted above the duty holster until replaced with the Heckler & Koch P7M8 with 4 magazines of ammunition by 1982.
  - Pennsylvania State Police: Issued in 1980 until replaced with the .40 caliber Beretta Semiautomatic pistol.
  - Postal Inspection Service
  - United States Army: M108, for issue to aviators, female Military Police, and CID.
  - United States Border Patrol
  - United States Marine Corps: M108 Embassy Guards.
  - Numerous Private Security Firms

== Gallery ==
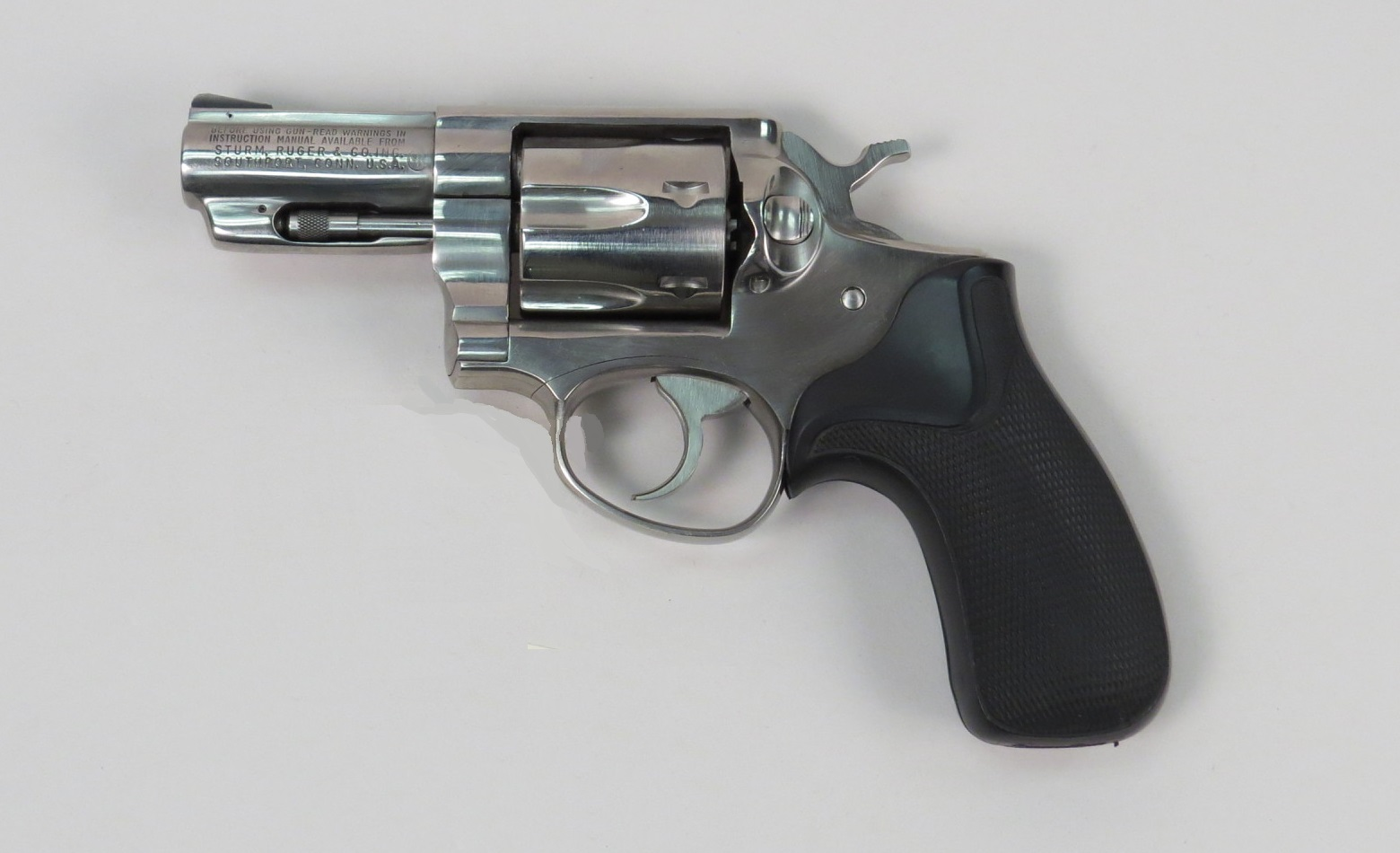
Ruger Speed Six

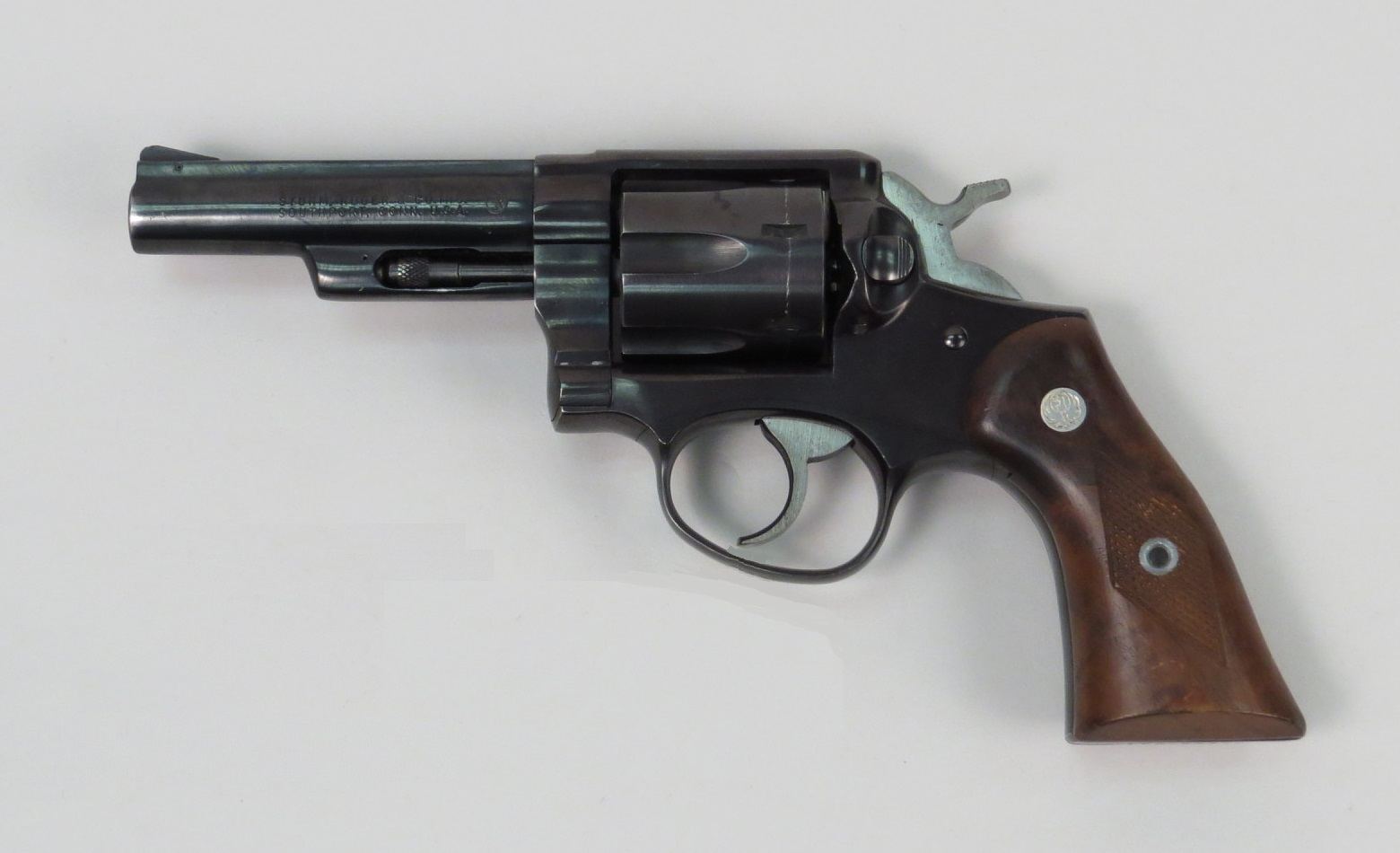
Ruger Security Six
