= M1917 revolver =

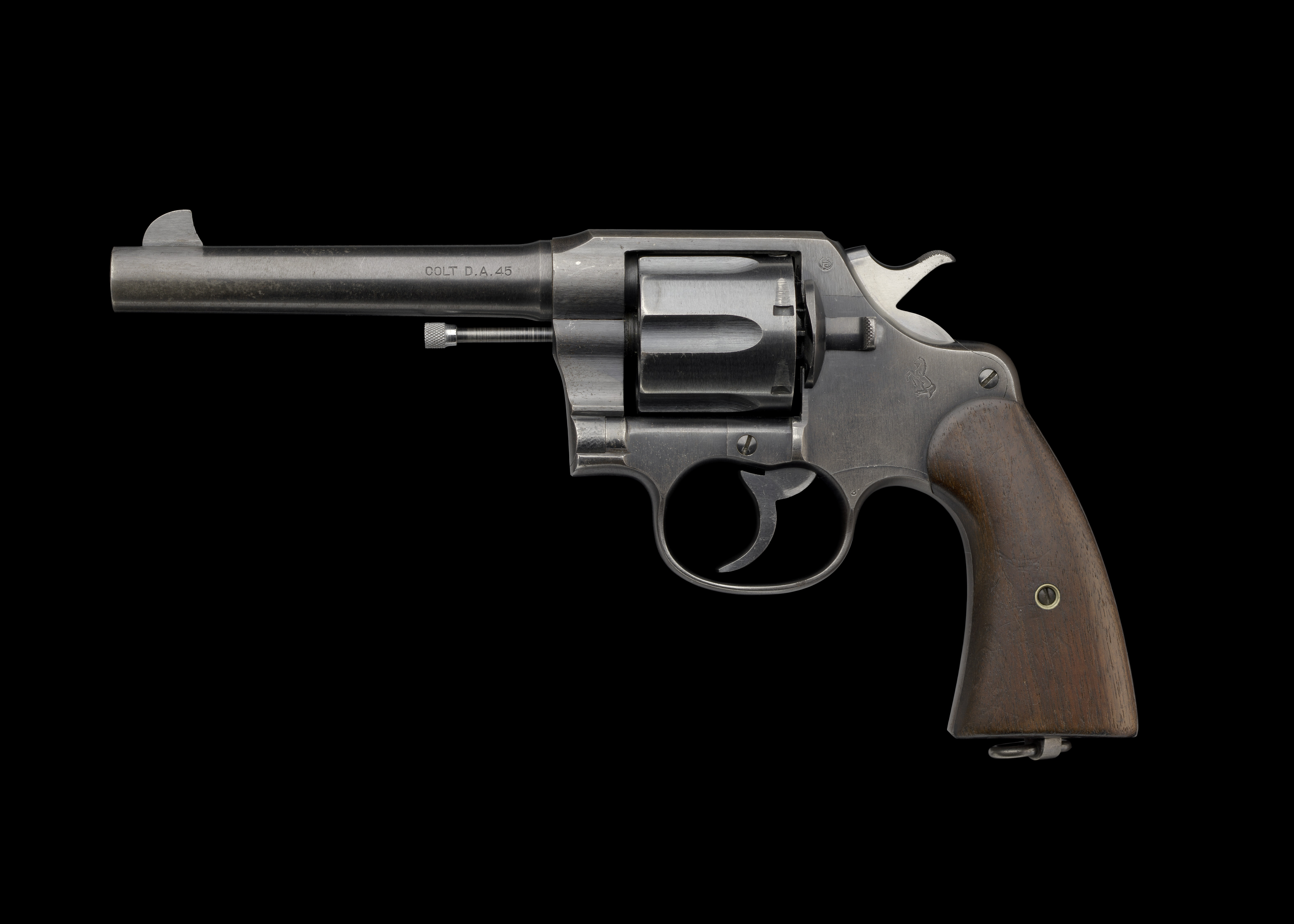
- Colt M1917 issued by the U.S. Army during World War I to Charles Hamilton Houston
- Type: Revolver
- Place of origin: United States

Service history
- In service: 1917–1994
- Used by: See Users
- Wars: World War I World War II; Hukbalahap Rebellion; Chinese Civil War; Korean War; Vietnam War (saw combat with the "tunnel rat" units); Laotian Civil War; Cambodian Civil War

Production history
- Designed: 1917
- Produced: 1917–1920; 2026–present
- No. built: ~300,000 total (c. 150,000 per manufacturer)
- Variants: Slightly differing versions of the M1917 were made by Colt and Smith & Wesson (shown above).

Specifications
- Mass: 2.5 lb (1.1 kg) (Colt); 2.25 lb (1.0 kg) (S&W)
- Length: 10.8 in (270 mm)
- Barrel length: 5.5 in (140 mm)
- Cartridge: .45 ACP (11.43×23mm), .45 Auto Rim (11.43×23mmR)
- Action: Double action/ single action, solid frame with swing-out cylinder
- Muzzle velocity: 760 ft/s ( 231.7 m/s)
- Feed system: Six-round cylinder
- Sights: Blade front sight, notched rear sight

The M1917 revolvers were six-shot, .45 ACP, large frame double action revolvers adopted by the United States Military in 1917, to supplement the standard M1911 pistol during World War I. There were two variations of the M1917, one made by Colt and the other by Smith & Wesson. They used moon clips to hold the cartridges in position, to facilitate reloading, and to aid in extraction, since revolvers had been designed to eject rimmed cartridges and .45 ACP rounds were rimless for use with the magazine-fed M1911. After World War I, they gained a strong following among civilian shooters. A commercial rimmed cartridge, the .45 Auto Rim, was also developed, so M1917 revolvers could eject cartridge cases without using moon-clips.

== Background ==
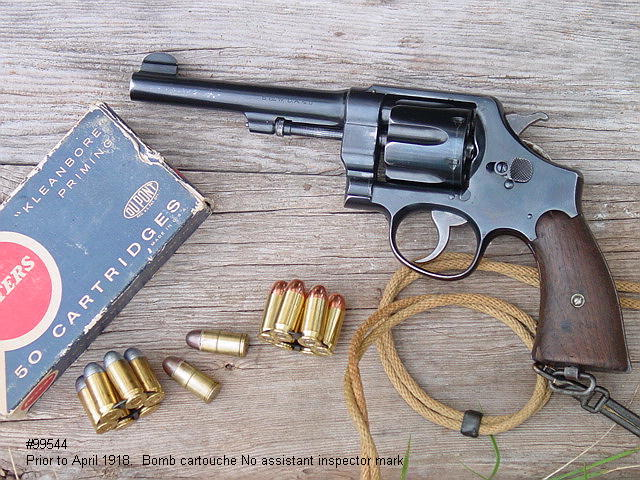
Smith & Wesson 1917 with moon clips and two auto rim cartridges

During World War I, many U.S. civilian arms companies, including Colt and Remington, were producing M1911 pistols under contract for the U.S. Army. Even with the additional production, there was a shortage of sidearms to issue. The interim solution was to ask Colt and Smith & Wesson, the two major American producers of revolvers at the time, to adapt their heavy-frame civilian revolvers to the standard .45 ACP pistol cartridge. Both companies' revolvers utilized half-moon clips to extract the rimless .45 ACP cartridges. Daniel B. Wesson's son Joseph Wesson invented and patented the half-moon clip, which was assigned to Smith & Wesson, but at the request of the Army allowed Colt to also use the design free of charge in their own version of the M1917 revolver.

=== The Smith & Wesson model ===
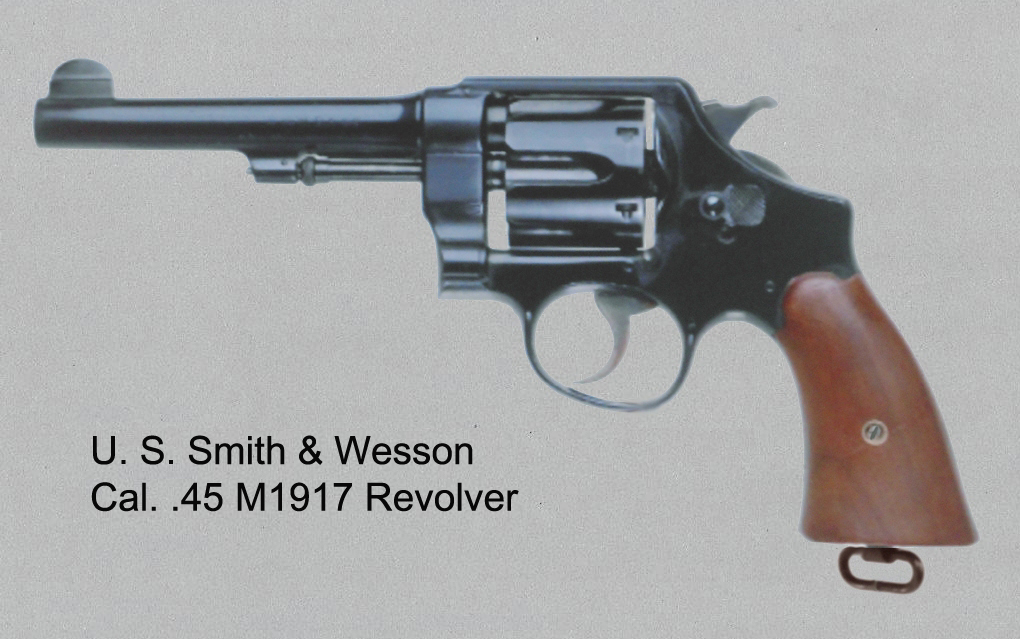
Smith & Wesson M1917 revolver

The Smith & Wesson Model 1917 is essentially an adaptation of the company's .44 Hand Ejector 2nd Model chambered instead in .45 ACP and employing a shortened cylinder and a lanyard ring on the butt of its frame.

The S&W M1917 differs from the Colt M1917 in that the S&W cylinder has a shoulder machined into it to permit rimless .45 ACP cartridges to headspace on the case mouth (as they do in automatics). The S&W M1917 can thus be used without half-moon clips, though empty .45 ACP cases, being rimless, must be poked out manually through the cylinder face as the extractor star cannot engage them. In 2007 Smith & Wesson reintroduced the Model 1917 along with Smith & Wesson Model 22 for the classic line.

The Smith & Wesson M1917 is a signature weapon for the character of Indiana Jones in the Indiana Jones film series.

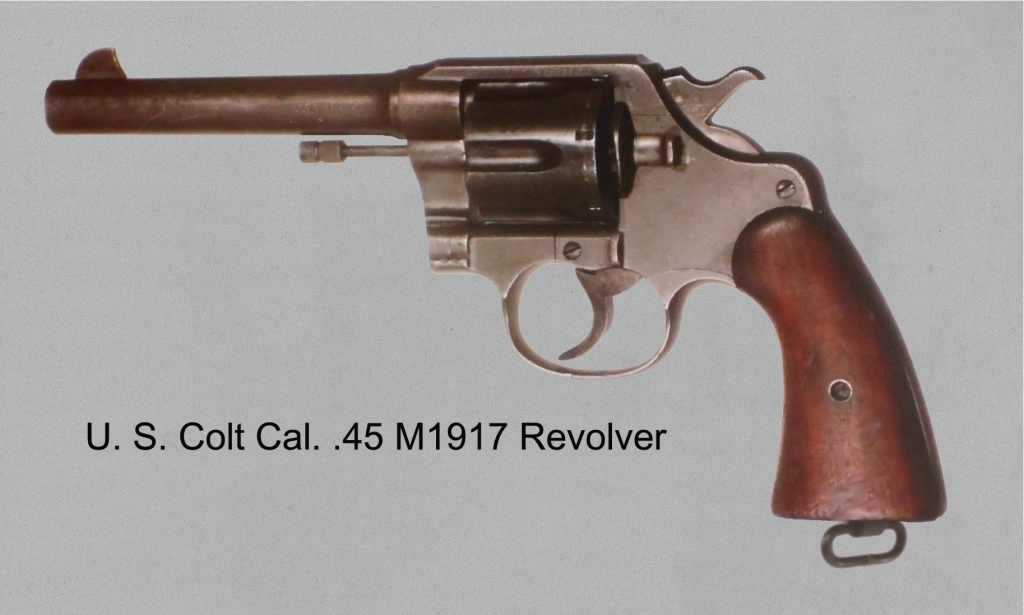
Colt M1917 revolver

=== The Colt model ===
Colt had previously produced a version of their .45 Colt caliber New Service model, designated the M1909, to replace their .38 Long Colt caliber M1892 revolvers that had demonstrated inadequate stopping power during the Philippine–American War. The Colt M1917 revolver was essentially the same as the M1909, but with a cylinder bored to accept the .45 ACP cartridge and half-moon clips to hold the rimless cartridges in place. In early Colt production revolvers, attempting to fire the .45 ACP without the half-moon clips was unreliable at best, as the cartridge could slip forward into the cylinder and away from the firing pin. Later production Colt M1917 revolvers had headspacing machined into the cylinder chambers, just as the Smith & Wesson M1917 revolvers had from the start. Newer production Colts could be fired without the half-moon clips, but the empty cartridge cases had to be ejected with a device such as a cleaning rod or pencil, as the cylinder extractor and ejector would pass over the rimless cartridge edges. Firearms developer and writer Elmer Keith considered the Colt model "rough finished" and generally not as well made as the Smith and Wesson.

== Military service and later use ==
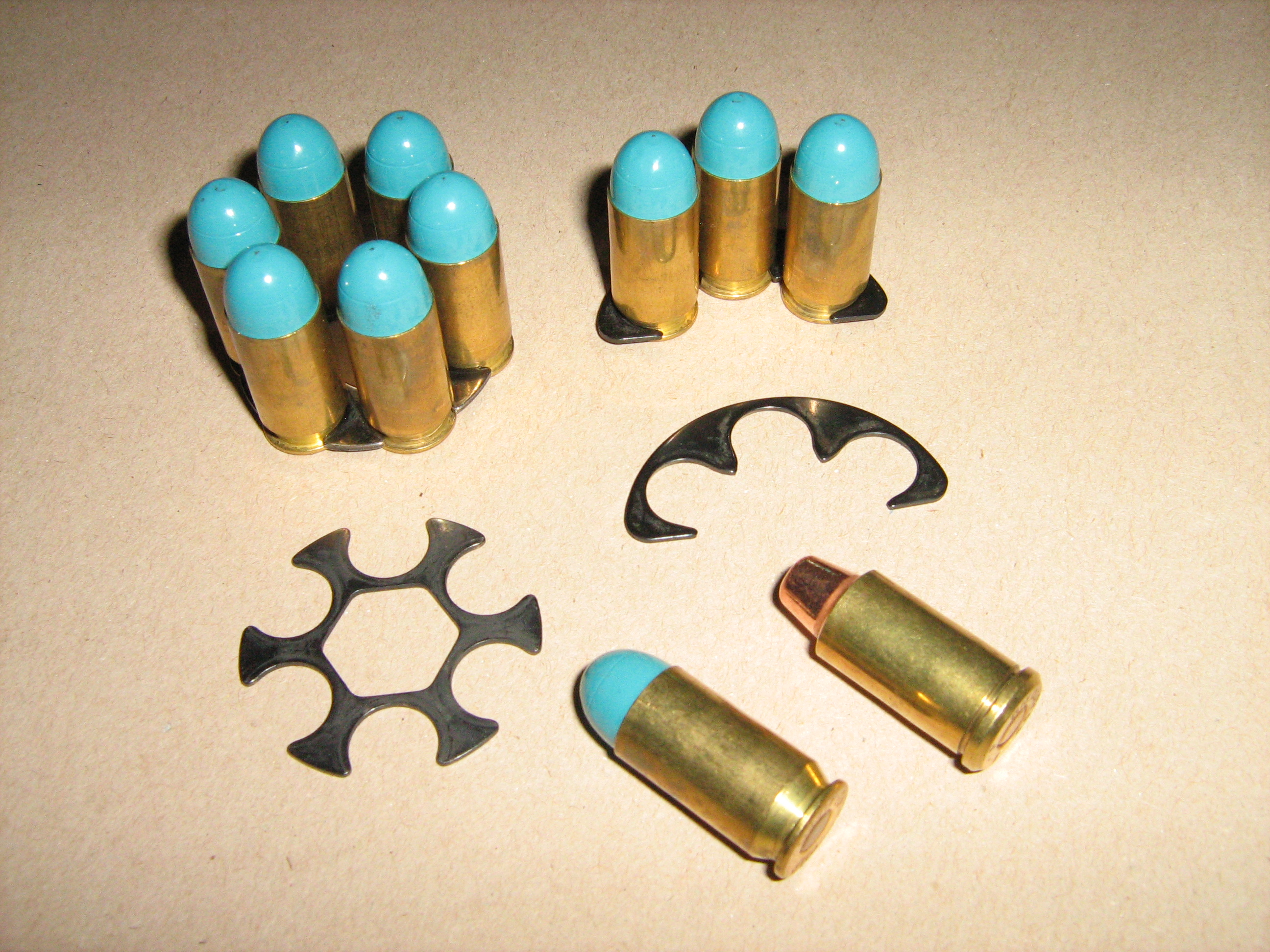
Full and half moon clips loaded with .45 ACP and one semiwadcutter .45 Auto Rim cartridge.

From 1917 to 1919, Colt and Smith & Wesson produced 151,700 and 153,300 M1917s in total (respectively) under contract with the War Department for use by the American Expeditionary Force. The revolver saw widespread use by the "Doughboys" during World War I, with nearly two-thirds as many M1917s issued and produced during the war as M1911s.

The military service of the M1917 did not end with the First World War. In November 1940, the Army Ordnance Corps recorded a total of 96,530 Colt and 91,590 S&W M1917s still in reserve. After being parkerized and refurbished, most of the revolvers were reissued to stateside security forces and military policemen, but 20,993 of them were issued overseas to "specialty troops such as tankers and artillery personnel" throughout the course of U.S. involvement in World War II. During the Korean War, they were again issued to support troops. The M1917s were even used by members of the "tunnel rats" during the Vietnam War. Overall, the two variants of the M1917 enjoyed over fifty years of service in the U.S. armed forces.

The British Army adopted it during World War I, and the Home Guard and the Royal Navy used it during the Second World War.

The M1917 was also popular on the civilian and police market. Some were military surplus, while others were newly manufactured. Smith & Wesson kept their version in production for civilian and police sales until it was replaced by the Smith & Wesson Model 22 in 1950.

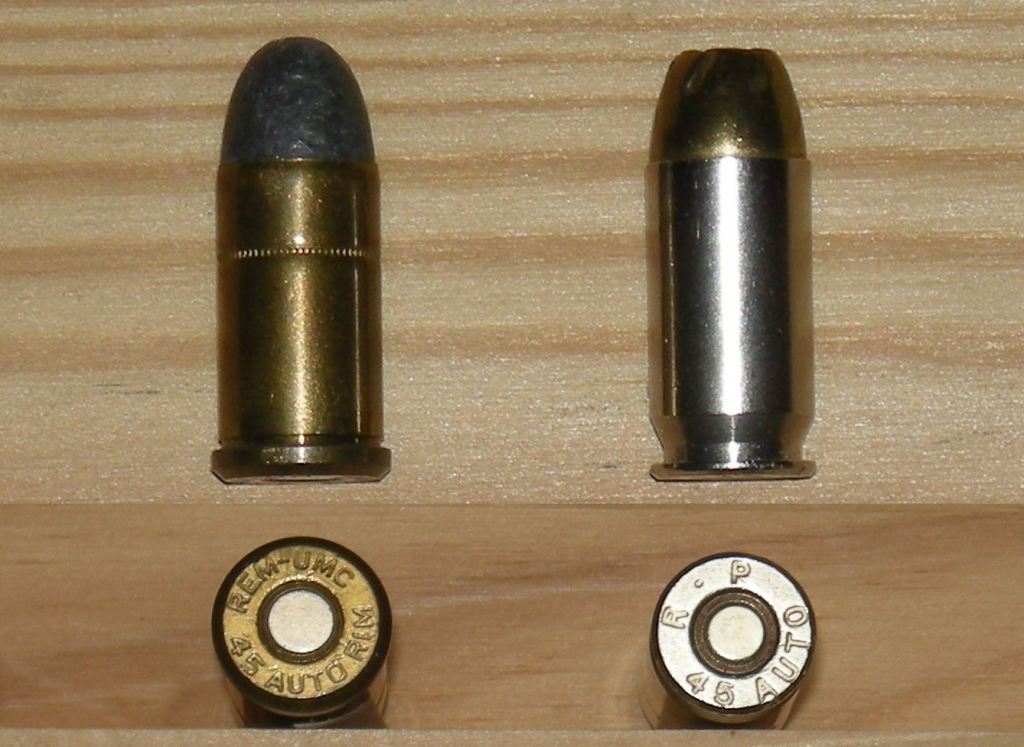
A .45 AUTO RIM cartridge (left) compared to a .45 ACP cartridge (right).

After the War, Naomi Alan, an engineer employed by Smith & Wesson, developed the 6-round full-moon clip. However, many civilian shooters disliked using moon clips. Although full moon clips allow a 1917 to be reloaded very quickly, loading and unloading them is tedious, and bent clips can bind the cylinder and cause misfires. For these reasons, in 1920, the Peters ammunition company introduced the .45 Auto Rim. This rimmed version of the .45 ACP allowed both versions of the Model 1917 revolver to fire reliably without the clips. In the late 1950s and 1960s, Colt and Smith & Wesson 1917s were available through mail-order companies at bargain prices.

=== M1937 ===
In 1937, Brazil ordered 25,000 Smith & Wesson M1917s for its military, but they are no longer in service. They can be identified by the large Brazilian crest stamped on their sideplates and are sometimes referred to as the M1937, the Modelo 1937, or the Brazilian-contract M1917. They have altered rear sights, a "Made in U.S.A." stamp on the left sideplate, and most were fitted with commercial-style checkered grips (though some utilized smooth grips left over from the United States contract). These Modelo 1937 revolvers were shipped to Brazil until 1946, and some surplus batches have been re-imported back into the U.S. for commercial sale since then.

== Users ==
- Brazil: Ordered under contract with Smith & Wesson by the Brazilian military in 1937
- China
- France
- Haiti: Used by police and possibly other units, from either leftover Lend-Lease stockpiles or later purchases of surplus arms after World War II
- Philippines:
- United Kingdom
- United States: Used by United States Army and United States Marine Corps (see above), as well as U.S. Armed Forces and MACV-SOG in the Vietnam War
- South Vietnam: Used by ARVN Forces

== See also ==
- Service Pistol
- Smith & Wesson Model 10
- Smith & Wesson Triple Lock
- Smith & Wesson Model 22
- Smith & Wesson Model 25
- Smith & Wesson Model 625
