= Smith & Wesson Model 646 =

- Type: Revolver
- Place of origin: United States

Production history
- Designed: 2000
- Manufacturer: Smith & Wesson

Specifications
- Cartridge: .40 S&W
- Action: Double-action
- Feed system: Six round cylinder loaded with moon clips

The Smith & Wesson Model 646 is a six-shot, double-action revolver chambered for the .40 S&W pistol cartridge, manufactured in 2000 and 2003 by the United States company Smith & Wesson.

== Design ==
The 646 was offered in a stainless steel finish with titanium cylinder. Production was limited to 900 guns. It was offered in a Performance Center version in 2000 (almost 600 revolvers) as a space-age looking stainless steel revolver with a slab-sided heavy barrel and matte gray titanium cylinder. In 2003 a limited run (300) was made with a more traditional underlug barrel design.

== Operation and availability ==
The 646 is unusual in that it is a revolver chambered for a rimless cartridge generally used only for semi-automatic pistols. In order to effectively use the rimless .40 S&W cartridge, the revolver utilized moon clips, a metal flange which holds the cartridges in place for loading and ejection.

== See also ==
- Smith & Wesson Model 686
- Smith & Wesson
- Moon clip
