= Speedloader =

Device used to reduce the time and/or effort needed to reload a firearm

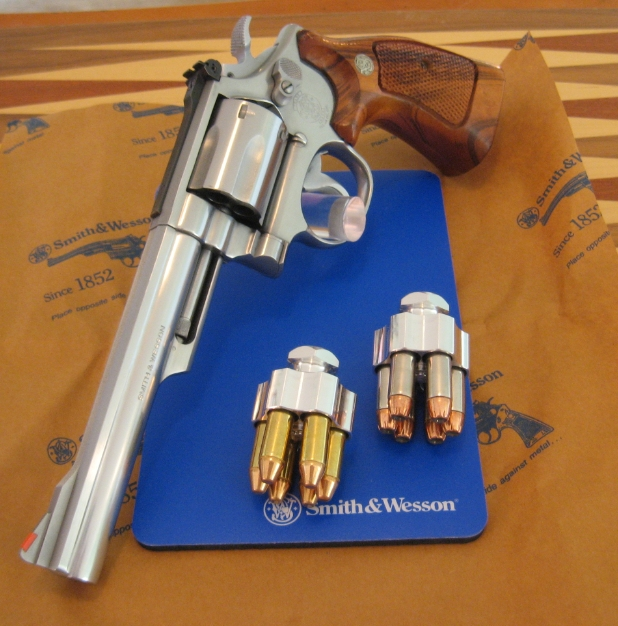
A Smith & Wesson Model 66 revolver, displayed with two speedloaders

A speedloader is a device used to reduce the time and effort needed to reload a firearm. Speedloaders come in a variety of forms for reloading revolvers, or the magazines used with other types of firearms such as rifles and shotguns.

Generally, speedloaders are used for loading multiple chambers of a revolver simultaneously. Such speedloaders are used for revolvers having either swing-out cylinders or top-break cylinders. Revolvers having fixed cylinders must be unloaded and loaded one chamber at a time. Speedloaders of different designs are used for loading the fixed tubular magazines of shotguns and rifles. Other speedloader designs are used to load the magazines (fixed or detachable) of semi-automatic firearms.

== Revolver speedloaders ==
=== Cylindrical reloaders ===
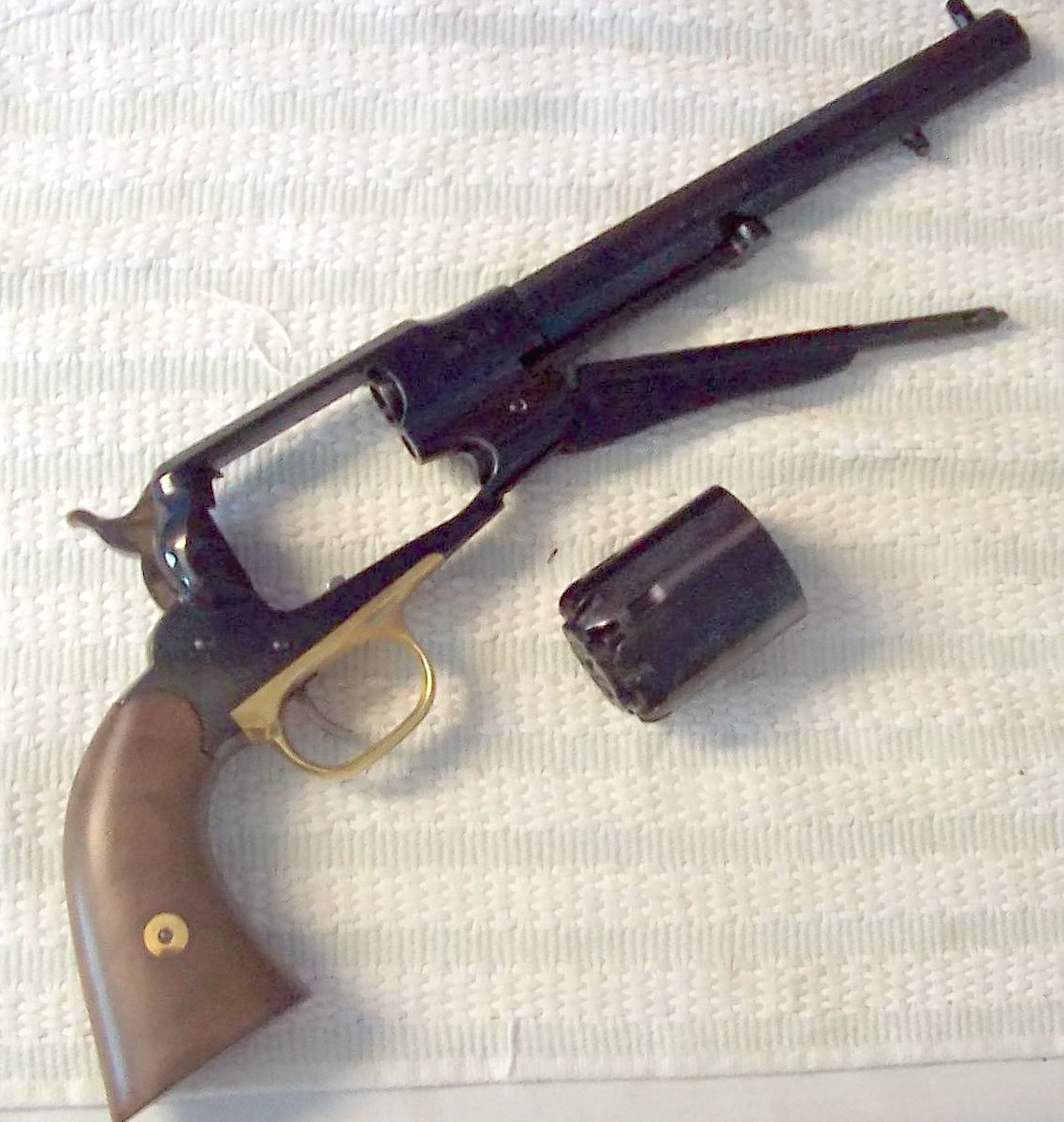
An 1858 New Model Army black-powder cap-and-ball revolver replica. The cylinder has been removed from the frame.

The modern revolver circular speedloader holds a full cylinder complement of cartridges in a secure fashion, spaced in a circular configuration so as to allow the cartridges to drop simultaneously into the cylinder easily (although non-circular types such as half moon clips are very common as well). A mechanism is provided that allows the cartridges to be released from the speedloader when loaded, so that when it is removed, the cartridges remain in the cylinder. The most common type of speedloader uses a rotating latch. Another type slides the cartridges out an open side; and a third type has a latch that releases when pressed.

Revolver speedloaders make the process of reloading an appropriately matched revolver much faster than reloading one round at a time (provided that ready-loaded speedloaders are available). Swing-out and top-break revolvers are designed to eject all cartridges with one movement, and speedloaders allow loading with but a single additional step. They also provide a convenient way to carry ammunition for a revolver. Speedloaders do not, however, allow revolvers to be reloaded as fast as semiautomatic handguns without considerably more practice.

Prior to the introduction of speedloaders for revolvers, reloading of revolvers was always accomplished by manually loading each cartridge into each chamber from cartridge loops on a belt or bandolier, a cartridge pouch, or other cartridge holder, such as a pocket. In fact, handloading is still the most common way of loading a revolver, speedloaders being mostly restricted to competition shooters and those who feel that they need more firepower for their personal defense revolver, since although speedloaders are useful for carrying one or several reloads at ready, one must load the speedloaders themselves prior to using.

Prior to the introduction of modern metallic cartridges (i.e. 1860–1879), certain models of older black powder cap and ball revolvers could be used with multiple replaceable cylinders functioning as "speedloaders". It was, however, generally easier to simply buy and carry a second revolver than to find a cylinder separately, and switching to another weapon is faster than swapping cylinders. As the reloading process for a cap and ball revolver was lengthy and time-consuming, carrying already-loaded cylinders with percussion caps placed on cylinder nipples could offer a considerable improvement in reloading time, although historically, this was not typically done, and is more common among modern-day enthusiasts and exhibition shooters. When "spare cylinders" were carried, the weapons were usually Remington revolvers, as their cylinders are easily removable and are held by a cylinder pin, unlike the early Colt revolvers, which are held together by a wedge that goes through the cylinder pin.

The first revolver speedloader patented was that of William H. Bell in 1879.

=== Moon clips and half moon clips ===
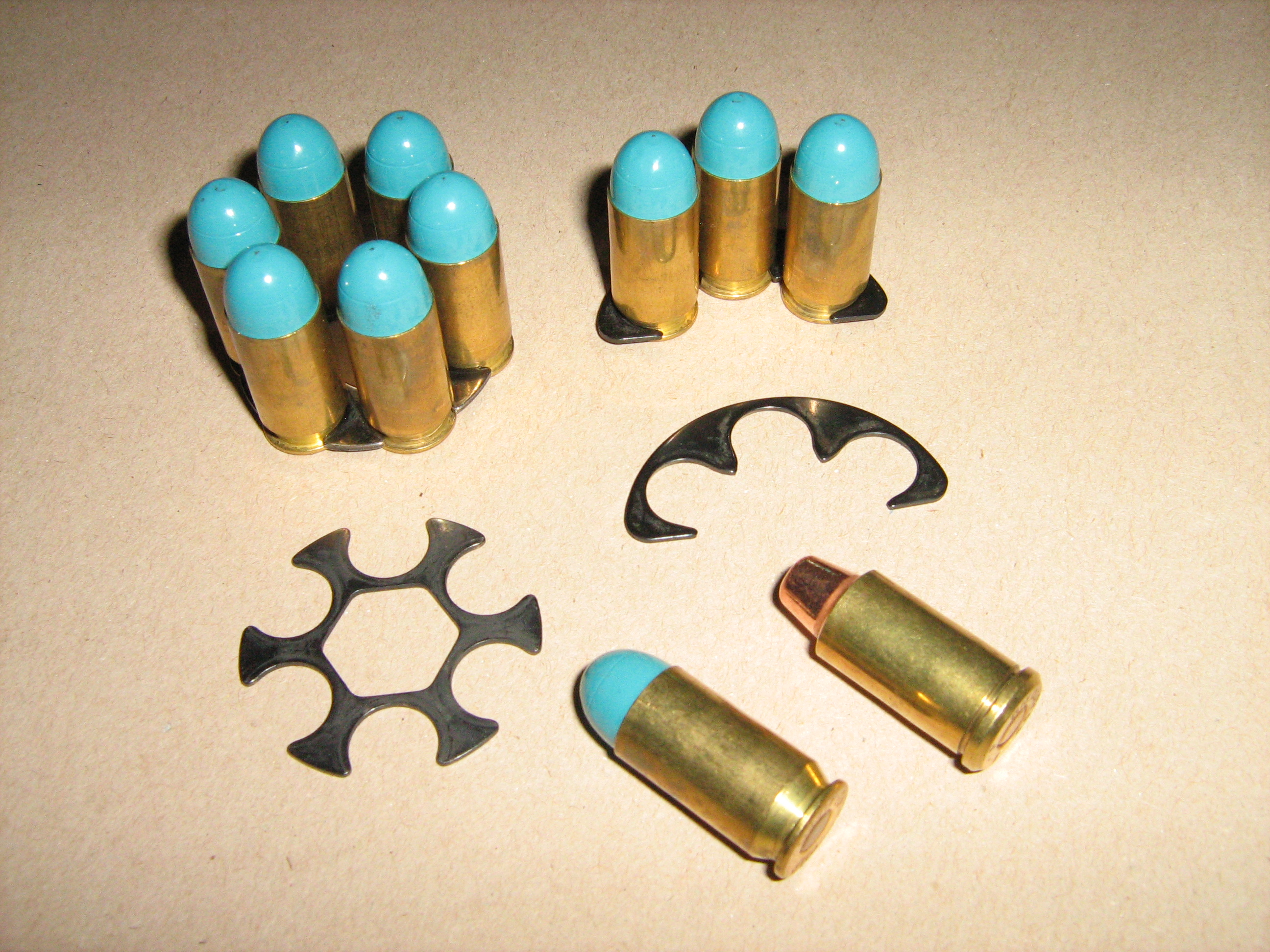
Full and half moon clips loaded with .45 ACP ammunition

Moon clips and half moon clips are special speedloaders for use with revolvers that chamber rimless cartridges, such as 9×19mm Parabellum or .45 ACP. Double-action revolvers are designed to use rimmed cartridges, and the extractors are incapable of removing rimless cartridges. Because of this fact, a different method of extraction must be used. Moon clips are a full circle, and hold a full cylinder of cartridges, while half moon clips are semicircles that hold half a cylinder full of cartridges.

=== Speed strips ===
Another variation of the speedloader for revolvers is the Speed Strip introduced by Bianchi International. Intended as an alternative to loose rounds in a pocket or dump pouch, it holds six cartridges in a re-usable Neoprene plastic strip. The strip operates by placing the cartridges one or two at a time into their respective chambers, and "breaking" the rounds off the strip into the chamber.

== Magazine loaders ==
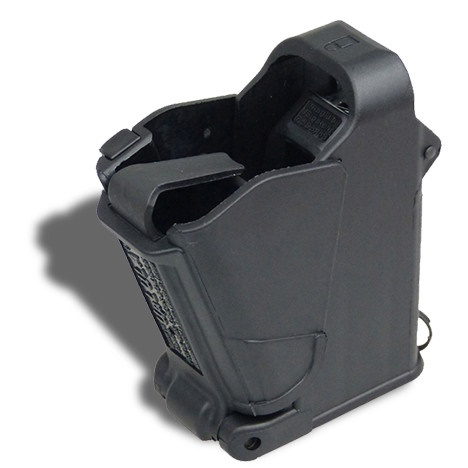
UpLULA universal pistol magazine loader

Loading a firearm magazine, particularly one with a large capacity and a corresponding high spring pressure pushing the rounds to the top of the magazine, can be quite difficult. A number of devices are available to make this task simpler, which are sometimes called speedloaders but are more commonly known as magazine loaders, stripper clips, spoons, or stripper clip guides. The simplest are inexpensive devices that depress the top round in the magazine, allowing the next round to be partially inserted with no pressure on it. These are also called "thumb savers", and address ease of loading more than speed of loading. There are also devices available for certain popular firearms, such as the Ruger 10/22, that accept loose ammunition and will load a round into the magazine with a simple push of a button or turn of a crank. These are more complex and expensive (US$25 to US$50), but are more truly a speedloader since they do greatly reduce the time required to load a magazine.

== Stripper clips ==
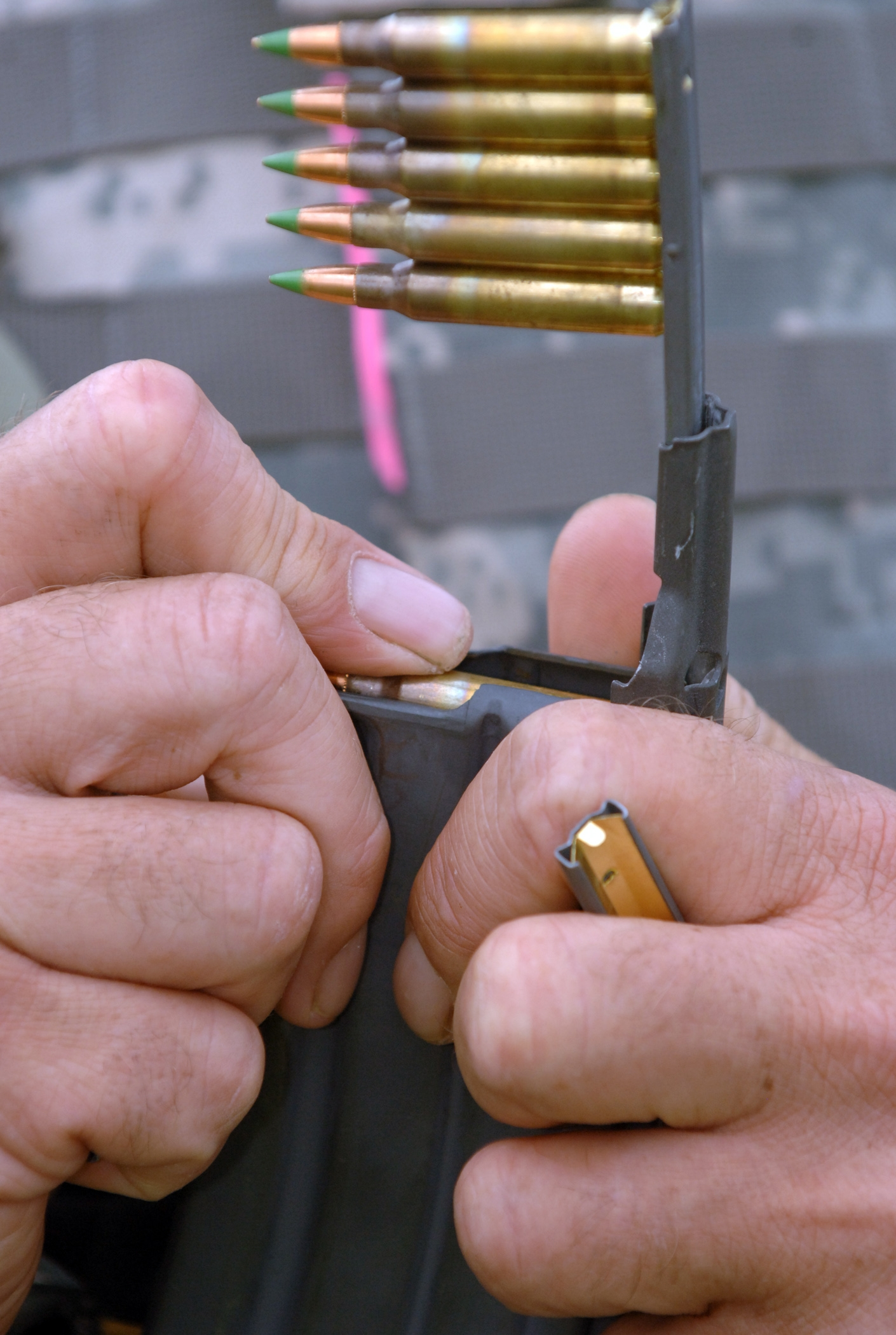
5.56 NATO stripper clip and speedloader.

A stripper clip is a device that holds a number of rounds, usually from five to ten, and allows them to be inserted into a magazine (internal or detachable) by attaching the clip to a special bracket and pressing the rounds into place. Military ammunition is often packaged in stripper clips, which, in older bolt-action rifles, could be loaded directly into the rifle's internal magazine using a bracket machined into the rifle's action, or in modern rifles by the use of an adapter or guide that attaches the stripper clip to a detachable magazine.

== Shotgun and rifle quickloaders ==
While much less common than revolver speedloaders, speedloaders for tubular magazines, called quickloaders, have been around for many years and offer many of the same quick reloading ability benefits. The simplest quickloader of this type is the one used for rimfire rifles with front loading tubular magazines. In this case, the quickloader is simply a tube that contains a magazine-capacity number of cartridges, with a seal at one end and a gate at the other. To load the magazine, the follower is removed, the rifle is pointed upwards, the tube is placed over the end of the magazine, and the gate is opened. Gravity then pulls the cartridges from the quickloader into the magazine, the quickloader is set aside, and the follower is replaced. Any length of tubing or pipe of the right diameter can be used in this way, with a simple pin through the middle serving as a gate. Commercial rimfire quickloaders often have multiple tubes joined together in parallel, with a single rotating gate. This allows multiple reloads to be carried, with reloading accomplished by simply rotating the gate in line with the next full tube of ammunition.

Shotgun speedloaders are slightly more complex, since shotgun magazines load from the breech. Shotgun speedloaders generally require a special bracket be mounted near the magazine loading port of the gun; many models mount by replacing existing pins that hold the trigger group in the receiver, and so can be installed easily without permanent modification of the gun. This bracket serves to hold the end of the speedloader tube in the correct position to feed the rounds out of the speedloader and into the magazine. The speedloaders themselves consist of a plastic tube containing a slot cut in it, and a plunger that rides in the slot and that forces the rounds into the magazine. Capacity is usually four or five rounds of 2.75 in (70 mm) length shells. Gravity is not suitable for operating these, as the rounds must be forced into the magazine against the pressure of the magazine spring. Shotgun speedloaders are most commonly encountered in action shooting sports like International Practical Shooting Confederation (IPSC) shotgun competitions.

== Gallery ==
View from front of loaded HKS revolver speedloader.

View from front of unloaded HKS revolver speedloader.

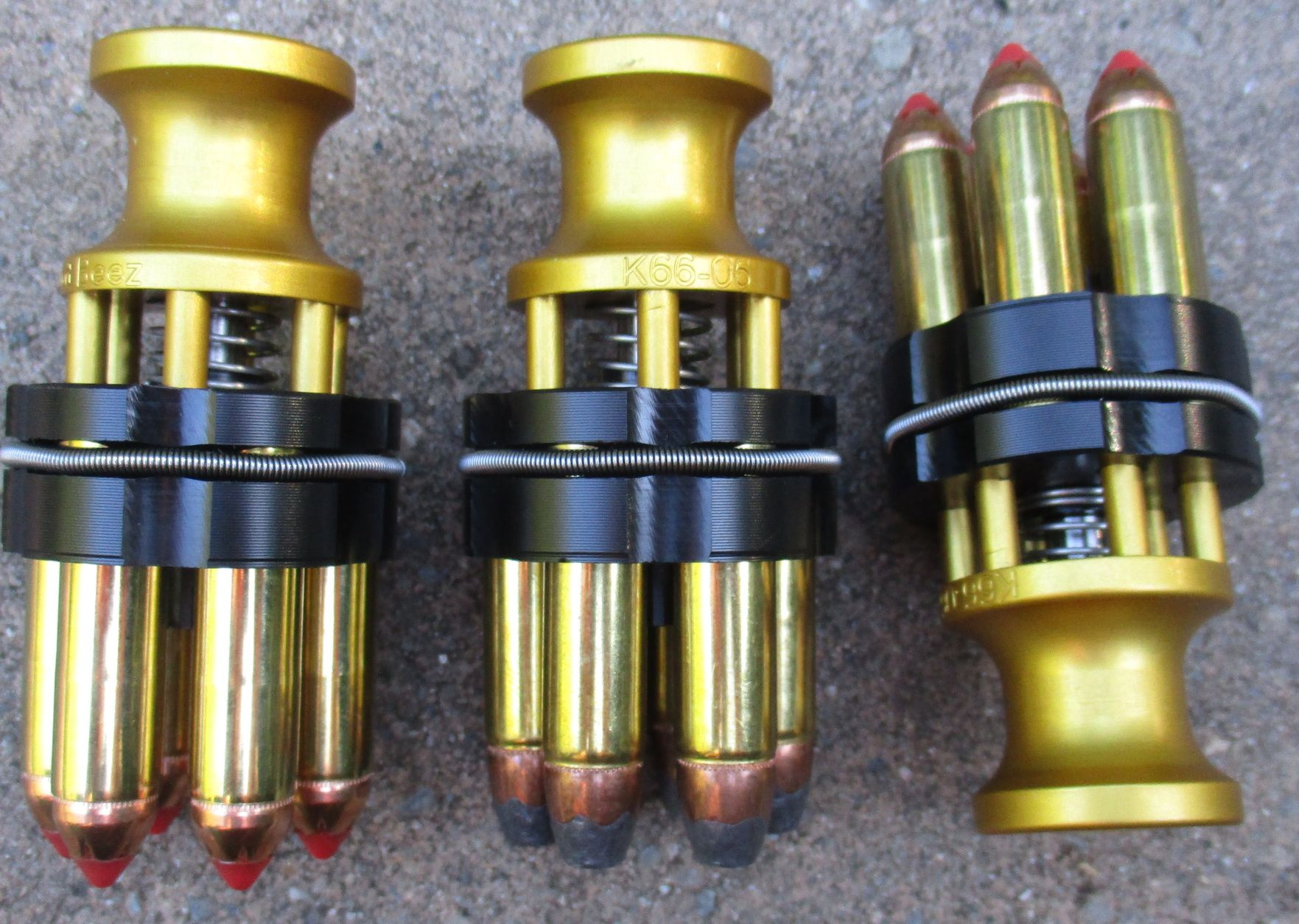
Speed Beez type speedloaders loaded with .357 Magnum cartridges.

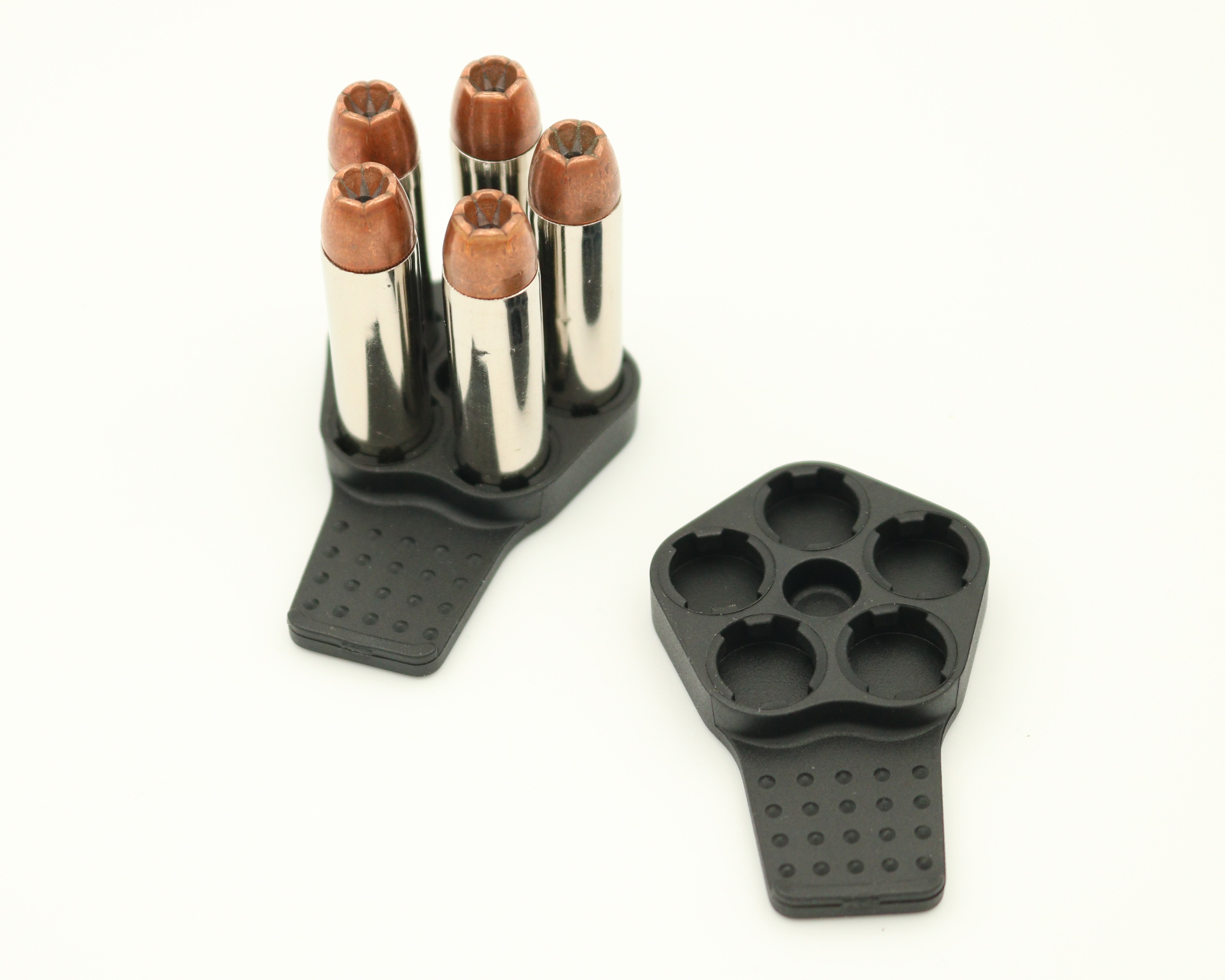
Zeta6 J-Frame Speed Clip

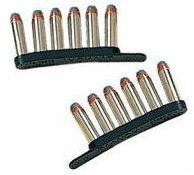
Bianchi Speed Strips, used to quickly load a revolver two chambers at a time.

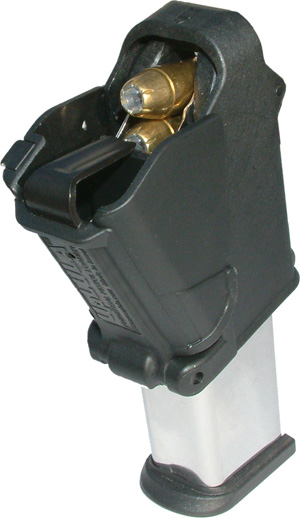
UpLULA universal pistol magazine loader.

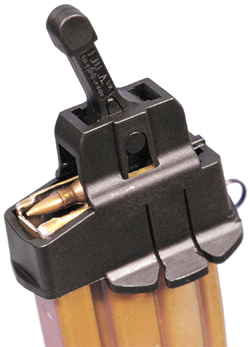
M-16 / AR-15 LULA rifle magazine loader and unloader.

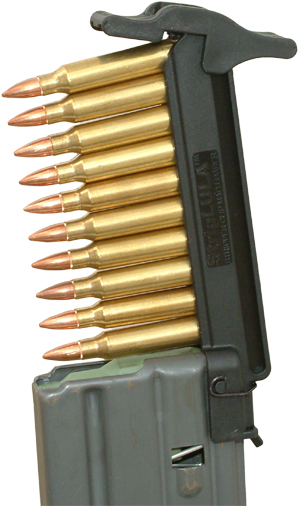
M-16 / AR-15 StripLULA rifle magazine loader and unloader.

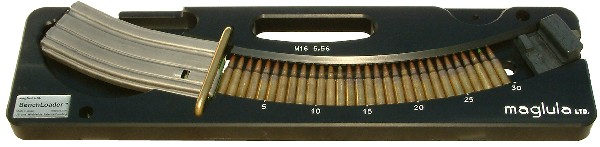
BenchLoader heavy-duty rifle magazine loader.

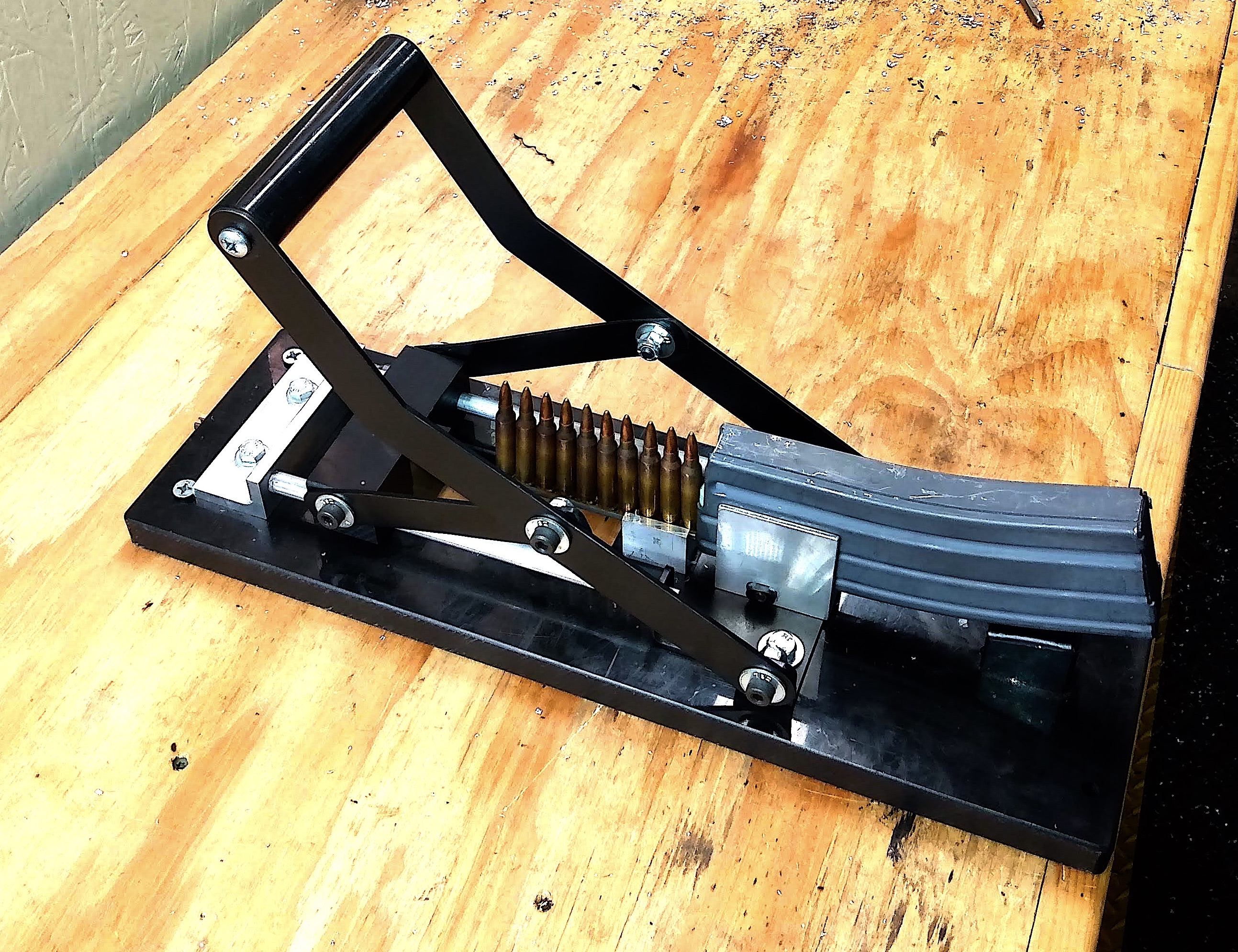
Trijent Mech-loader for high volume loading

== See also ==
- Clip/stripper-fed firearm
