= .45 Auto Rim =

Revolver cartridge designed by the Peters Cartridge Company

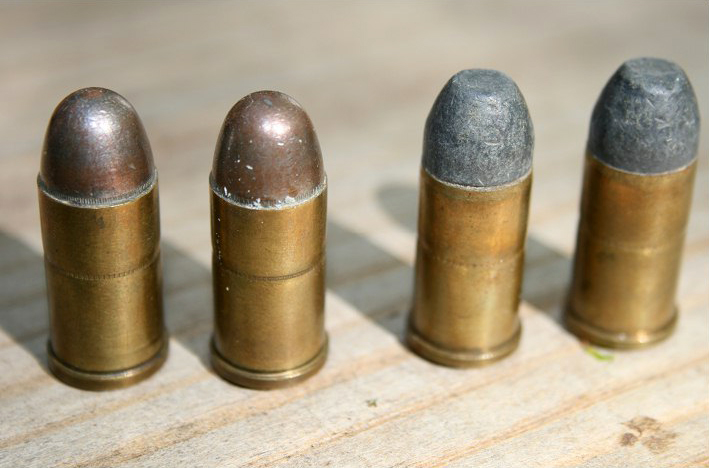
- On left: Two Remington UMC Auto Rim factory loads On right: Two Peters Cartridge Auto Rim factory loads
- Type: Revolver
- Place of origin: United States

Production history
- Designed: 1920
- Manufacturer: Peters Cartridge Company; Remington; Corbon
- Produced: 1920–present

Specifications
- Case type: Rimmed
- Bullet diameter: 0.452 in (11.5 mm)
- Neck diameter: 0.4685 in (11.90 mm)
- Base diameter: 0.4709 in (11.96 mm)
- Rim diameter: 0.5154 in (13.09 mm)
- Rim thickness: 0.0827 in (2.10 mm)
- Case length: 0.9004 in (22.87 mm)
- Overall length: 1.2646 in (32.12 mm)
- Primer type: Large pistol
- Maximum pressure (CIP): 17,400 psi (120 MPa)
- Maximum CUP: 15,000 CUP

Ballistic performance
Bullet mass/type	Velocity	Energy
160 gr (10 g) JHP	1,050 ft/s (320 m/s)	392 ft⋅lbf (531 J)
185 gr (12 g) LRN	800 ft/s (240 m/s)	264 ft⋅lbf (358 J)
230 gr (15 g) FMJ	855 ft/s (261 m/s)	375 ft⋅lbf (508 J)
230 gr (15 g) FMJ	750 ft/s (230 m/s)	287 ft⋅lbf (389 J)

The .45 Auto Rim, also known as 11.5x23mmR, is a rimmed cartridge specifically designed to be fired in revolvers originally chambered for the .45 ACP cartridge.

The Peters Cartridge Company developed the cartridge in 1920 for use in the M1917 revolver, large numbers of which had become available as surplus following the end of World War I.

Two issues related to the use of .45 ACP ammunition in the M1917 revolver led to the development of the .45 Auto Rim. The M1917 had previously been used with half-moon clips that held three rounds of .45 ACP, a rimless cartridge. But if half-moon or moon clips are not used when firing a rimless cartridge in a revolver, the spent cases must be ejected by hand—either by shaking the revolver and its swing-out cylinder or by poking the cases with a rod or field-expedient tool, like a pencil—as the revolver's extractor cannot grab them. The second issue concerned headspace. In revolver cylinders not engineered to allow .45 ACP to headspace properly, as in early production Colt M1917s, the cartridges could slip forward, stopping them from firing. Adding a rim to the .45 ACP cartridge solved both these issues.

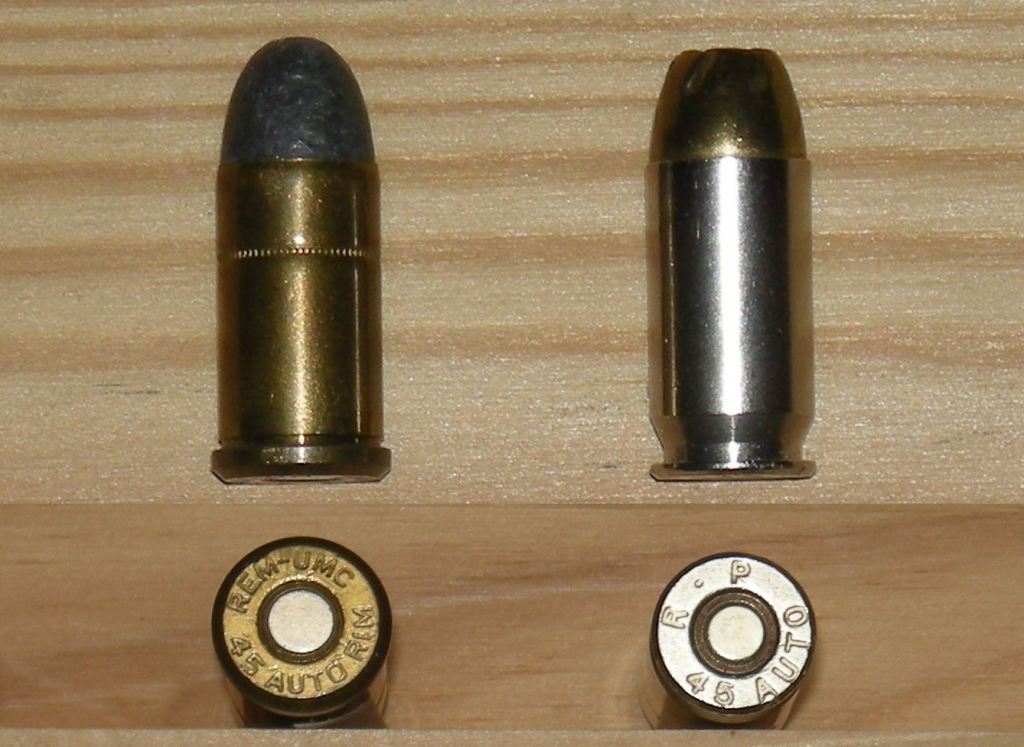
.45 Auto Rim/.45 ACP cartridge

Loads offered were similar to the standard military loads for the .45 ACP, but with fully lead bullets rather than the full metal jacket bullets used for .45 ACP. This was done to reduce barrel wear in the shallow rifled revolvers in which it was to be used.

The round is currently still in production by Corbon in their DPX and Performance Match lines of ammunition and is also manufactured by Georgia Arms and Buffalo Bore Ammunition.

== See also ==
- List of rimmed cartridges
