= Mare's Leg =

Cut down lever action rifle

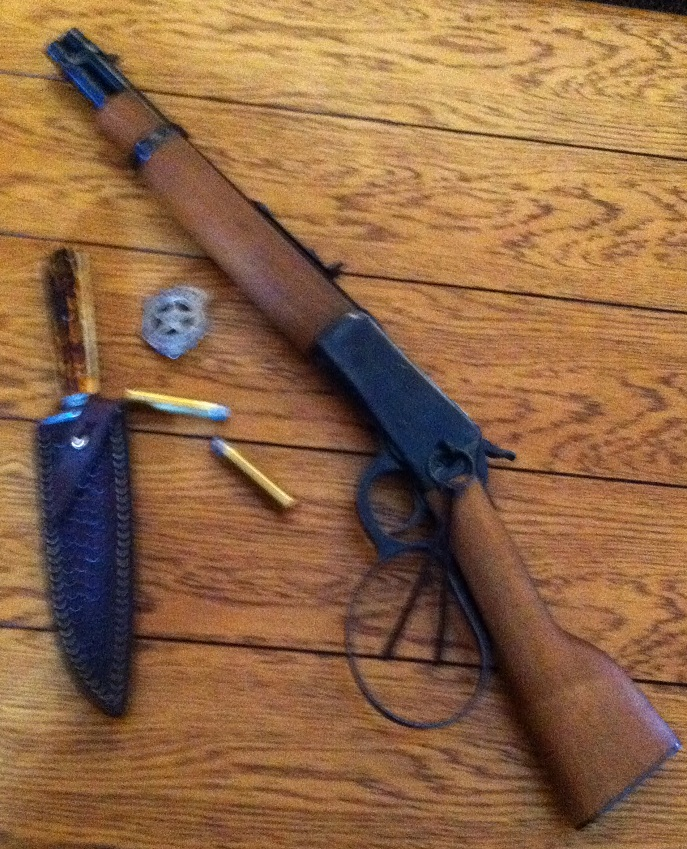
- Rossi Ranch Hand
- Type: Cut-down lever-action rifle
- Place of origin: United States

Production history
- Designer: Kenny "Von Dutch" Howard
- Designed: 1958
- Produced: 1958, 1993
- No. built: 3 (1958), ~2 (1993)

Specifications
- Length: ~2 ft (61 cm)
- Barrel length: ~12 in (30 cm)
- Cartridge: .44-40.44 Magnum.38 Special.357 Magnum.22 Long Rifle
- Action: Lever-action
- Feed system: 6-round tubular magazine

The Mare's Leg is a customized, shortened lever-action rifle made famous by Steve McQueen as bounty hunter Josh Randall. The weapon first appeared in the television series Trackdown (1958), in which McQueen guest-starred as Randall, and subsequently became a signature feature of the character in the spin-off series Wanted Dead or Alive (1958–1961). Mare's Leg is now a generic term for a Winchester Model 1892 (or modern derivative) with a shortened barrel and stock.

== Use in Trackdown ==
The term "mare's leg" was introduced in 1957 in the TV series Trackdown, where Steve McQueen first appeared as a bounty hunter. Steve McQueen and his Mare's Leg went on to star in the CBS TV series Wanted Dead or Alive.

Designed by Kenny "Von Dutch" Howard, an experienced artist and gunsmith, the original Mare's Leg was made by cutting down a .44-40 caliber Winchester Model 1892 rifle to a size that could be worn in a large leg holster and used with one hand. The barrel was cut to a length of nine inches, and much of the butt-stock was removed. The original Mare's Leg did not have sights. McQueen was involved in the final design, suggesting the duck-bill hammer and enlarged lever loop, and initiating a redesign of the custom holster. The Bureau of Alcohol, Tobacco, and Firearms was not consulted before the program aired and producers had to pay taxes totaling $1,100 in connection with the National Firearms Act of 1934.

During filming three guns were made, each with an enlarged loop on the cocking lever. After filming started, the size of the levers was made smaller on all 3 guns. The second and third guns bore octagonal barrels instead of a round one. In a continuity oversight, a gun sometimes changed partway through a given scene. While the guns were chambered for the .44-40 round, McQueen wore more impressive looking .45-70 rounds in the loops of his gun belt. In season one a doctor, after removing a bullet fired from the Mare's Leg from the back of a criminal, identified the removed bullet as a .30-30 round.

As of the 1980s, one of the original guns was on display at the now closed Spaghetti Station Restaurant and Museum (999 Ball Road, Anaheim, California). Another is in the Autry National Center of the American West. In 1964, French singer Gilbert Bécaud auctioned off one of the Mare's Legs used by Josh Randall. This auction took place in Paris in the presence of actor Steve McQueen, and the money raised was donated to the French Movement for Children's Villages (an association renamed in 2013 "Action Enfance").

There have been a number of toys based on the Mare's Leg, from small cap guns to larger detailed toys complete with a holster.

=== Other appearances ===
In the 1987 film Wanted: Dead or Alive, a sequel to the series starring Rutger Hauer as Nick Randall, the grandson of Josh Randall, Nick keeps his grandfather's Mare's Leg in a display case in his office.

Similar shortened rifles have appeared in:

- Once Upon a Time in the West (1968 film) used by Woody Strode in a cameo, when sent to kill Charles Bronson's character "Harmonica".
- Boss Nigger (1975 blaxploitation western) used by the main character.
- The Adventures of Brisco County, Jr. (1993–1994 television series) featured Crystal Hawks, a bounty hunter played by Sheena Easton, who used a Mare's Leg.
- Final Fantasy VII (RPG video game originally released for the PlayStation in 1997) features a gun named Randall (ランダル in Japanese), which can be wielded by one of the playable characters, Vincent Valentine. This same weapon makes an appearance in the gacha game, FFVII Ever Crisis (2023–2024), for use by the same character.
- Resident Evil 3: Nemesis (1999 survival horror video game) had main character Jill Valentine use this weapon as an unlockable item after defeating the Nemesis a certain number of times. Here, it is treated as a shotgun, and is given the designation M-37.
- The Magnificent Seven (1998–2000 television series) featured Eric Close as Mare's Leg wielding Vin Tanner, reminiscent of McQueen's character Vin in the original film.
- Firefly (2002 television series) and Serenity (2005 film) starred Gina Torres as Zoe Alleyne Washburne, who used the same Mare's Leg prop created for Brisco County, Jr.
- Fistful of Frags (2007 first-person shooter video game) as a starter weapon with high damage and low rate of fire.
- Umineko When They Cry (2007 visual novel video game) the character Kinzo Ushiromiya is mentioned to be a fan of Westerns and possesses several Mare's Leg guns as an imitation of Steve McQueen's character in Wanted: Dead or Alive. Various characters wield the weapon throughout the story.
- Zombieland (2009 film) used by Woody Harrelson throughout the film.
- Call of Duty: Modern Warfare 2 (2009) as the Model 1887, a shotgun unlocked in multiplayer when the player reaches Level 67.
- Archer (Season 5, Episode 3) Archer uses this gun in this episode.
- Metal Gear Solid V: The Phantom Pain (2015) Antagonist Skull Face uses this weapon.
- Battlefield 4 (2013) A modernised .44 Magnum Winchester Model 1892, available via an expansion pack, is referred to by this name.
- State of Decay (video game) (2013 survival horror game) The rifle is one of several accessible weapons used by the survivors.
- Warframe has the Grinlok rifle (a lever action rifle analogue) and a cut down version exists, known as the Marelok (a reference to the Mare's Leg name). It works much the same; a single shot pistol with incredible stopping power.
- In 2016 Pawan Kalyan, a popular Indian film actor, used a mare's leg rifle as a stylish weapon in his film Sardaar Gabbar Singh
- In Westworld (2016) Hector uses this weapon in seasons 1 and 2.
- Fallout (American TV series) Cooper Howard, or more commonly known as "The Ghoul" slings a metallic variant of the mare's leg during his shootout in Filly and subsequent appearances.

== Manufactured replicas ==
A number of companies have marketed functional reproductions of the Mare's Leg, making them the same way as the original, by cutting down Winchester rifles. These reproductions also have the same legal restrictions as the original: a rifle may not have a barrel length less than 16 inches (41 cm) without obtaining a tax stamp from the ATF, in accordance with the National Firearms Act. For countries like Canada, Mare's legs are made with 12 inch barrels.

Other companies have marketed reproductions originally made and sold as handguns. Because of the legal restrictions, non-functional prop-quality replicas have been produced by some of the same companies that make functional copies.

=== Carbine ===
Since before 2000, Eagle Squadron Productions has produced and sold an authentic 1892 Winchester Mare's Leg carbine. It uses a Winchester 1892 carbine in the correct caliber of .44-40, and is based on one of the original prop guns. They also produce replica gun belt and a non-firing replica carbine.

=== Handgun ===
Puma Bounty Hunter
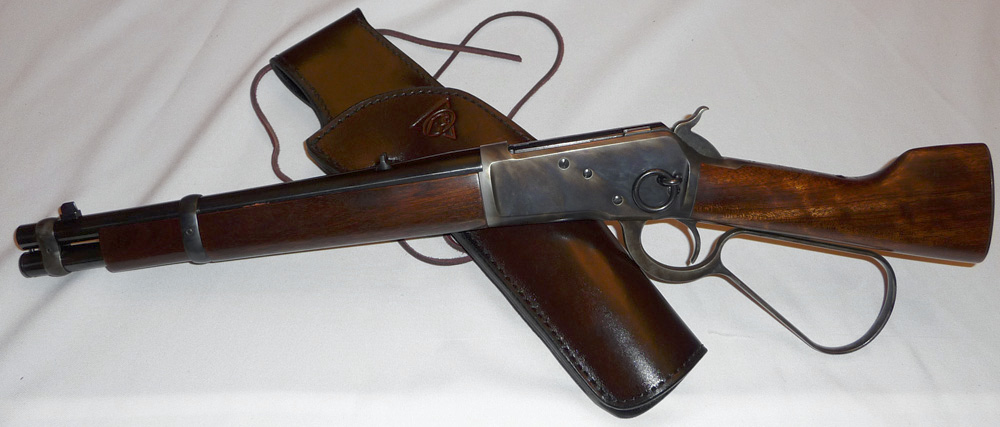
- Puma Bounty Hunter pistol and holster
- Type: Lever action handgun
- Place of origin: Italy

Production history
- Designed: 2008
- Manufacturer: Chiappa Firearms
- Produced: 2008–present

Specifications
- Length: 24 in (61 cm)
- Barrel length: 12 in (30 cm)
- Cartridge: .45 Colt; .44-40 Winchester; .38-40 Winchester; .44 Magnum; .357 Magnum
- Action: Lever-action
- Feed system: 6-round tubular magazine

In 2005, J.B. Custom began marketing a "1892 Mares Leg Lever Action Pistol". This pistol is a fully functional copy of Randall's weapon, available in a number of calibers. Since they are newly manufactured as pistols and sold subject to handgun regulations, rather than cut down rifles, they avoid legal difficulties. Like the original weapon, the J.B. Custom version has a 12-inch (30 cm) barrel, and an overall length of 24 inches (61 cm).

The pistol was available in .45 Colt, .44-40 Winchester, and .38-40 Winchester. Early promotional material specified a limited production run of 50 units based on the number of available 1892 actions that could be used legally. Later versions of the weapons use a slightly different action that while not exactly like the 1892 model, cycles more reliably, and is commercially available. This version is available in .44 Magnum, and .357 Magnum.

In 2008, Legacy Sports International introduced their version of the Mare's Leg, made by Chiappa Firearms, in Italy, imported for Legacy, and sold under the brand name "Puma". This Puma 92 pistol is named the Bounty Hunter. It is available in several calibers including; .44 Magnum, .45 Colt, and .44-40. With a 12-inch (30 cm) barrel, no shoulder stock, and a receiver that has never been built into a rifle, it is considered a pistol by the ATF.

In 2010 Rossi Firearms began offering a Mare's Leg under the name "Ranch Hand". The Rossi version is chambered in .45 Colt, .44 Magnum/.44 Special, and .357 Magnum/.38 Special. The Rossi Ranch Hand is manufactured by Taurus in Brazil.

Chiappa Firearms currently (as of January 2025) sells Mare's Legs in both the original 9-inch barrel and 12-inch barrel length variants. Available calibers are the original .44-40, as well as .44 Magnum, .45 Colt, and .357 Magnum.

Henry Repeating Arms manufactures two versions of the Mare's Leg. The rimfire model has a blued receiver and barrel and chambers .22 Long Rifle, .22 Long, and .22 Short. The centerfire model has a brass receiver and blued barrel and is available in .357 Mag, .44 Mag, and .45 Colt. Recently, Henry Repeating Arms has added another rimfire version chambered in 22 WMR, aka .22 Magnum.

=== Shotgun ===
Italian firms, such as Chiappa Firearms, manufacture modern reproductions of the Winchester Model 1887 series shotguns. The shotguns appeared on the Australian and the European firearms markets in late 2008. Chiappa's replicas are offered with barrels ranging from 28 to 18.5 inches. They also offer a model with a rifled barrel and two models with pistol grips.

The Model 1887 Mare's Leg was prominently used by the title character in the film Terminator 2: Judgment Day, portrayed by Arnold Schwarzenegger. One of the guns used in the film was modified with a pistol grip and an oversized loop on the trigger guard, allowing the character to fire and cycle the action with a one hand reverse spin. This in turn has popularised the gun's portrayal in various pop culture, mostly in shooter video games, where they mimic the cycling and reloading actions from the movie.

== Legal status ==
In the United States under the National Firearms Act, to make a short barreled rifle from a firearm originally made and sold as a rifle requires payment of $200 for a tax stamp, approval from the BATFE and federal registration. However, a "lever action pistol" made and sold subject to BATFE regulations is treated as a pistol by federal law. While most states allow the purchase of Mare's Leg lever action pistols, New York State has banned this gun from being sold there. They are also not approved for sale in Massachusetts. It is hard to get in California since it is not on the CA Roster of Approved Handguns (California Penal Code § 32015) and therefore cannot be sold or transferred to a civilian unless the gun is already privately owned within the state, having been previously imported under one of the narrow exemptions to the handgun roster.

== See also ==
- Pistola Herval - Brazilian real-life equivalent for cavalry usage
