= Winchester Model 1892 =

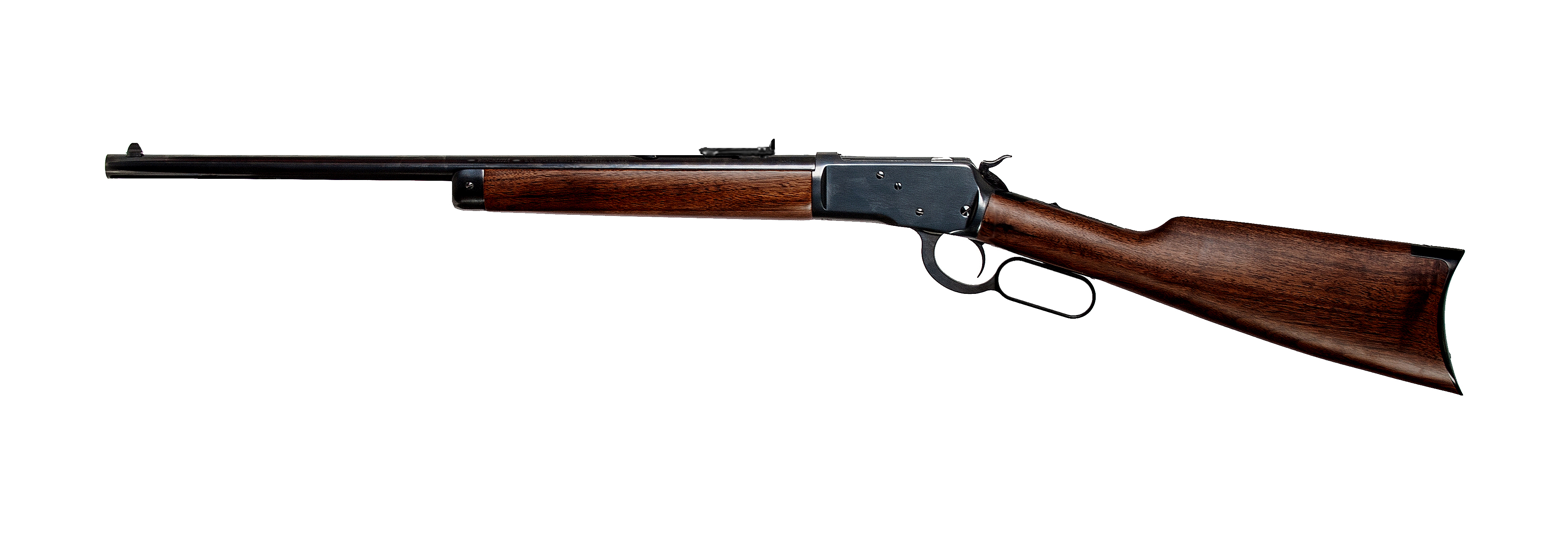
- Type: Lever-action centerfire rifle
- Place of origin: United States

Service history
- Used by: United States; France; Mexico
- Wars: Indian Wars; Spanish–American War; Mexican Revolution; World War I Constitutionalist Revolution

Production history
- Designer: John Browning
- Manufacturer: Winchester Repeating Arms Company
- Produced: 1892–1941
- No. built: 1,007,608

Specifications
- Caliber: .32-20 Winchester; .38-40 Winchester; .44-40 Winchester; .25-20 Winchester; .218 Bee (in late production)
- Action: Lever action
- Feed system: 9 to 14 rounds

The Winchester Model 1892 is a lever-action repeating rifle designed by John Browning as a smaller, lighter version of his large-frame Model 1886, and which replaced the Model 1873 as the company's lever-action for pistol-caliber rounds such as the .44-40.

== History ==
When asked by Winchester to design an improved lever action to compete with a recent Marlin offering, John Browning said he would have the prototype completed in under a month or it would be free. Within two weeks, Browning had a functioning prototype of the '92. Calibers for the rifle vary and some are custom-chambered. The original rounds were the .32-20, .38-40, and .44-40 Winchester centerfire rounds, followed in 1895 by the new .25-20. A few Model '92s chambered for .218 Bee were produced in 1936–38. Rifles in .44-40 proved to be most popular, far outstripping sales of the other chamberings.

The Winchester Models 53 (1924) and 65 (1933) were relabeled Model 1892s. Admiral Robert E. Peary carried an 1892 on his trips to the North Pole, and Secretary of War Patrick Hurley was presented with the one millionth rifle on December 13, 1932. Famous Amazon explorer Percy Fawcett carried a Winchester '92 on his expeditions and the famous jaguar hunter Sasha Siemel also used a short-barreled Winchester '92 carbine (with a bayonet attached). The Royal Navy used 21,000 examples during World War I.

The original Winchester company made 1,007,608 Model 1892 rifles. The Depression greatly affected sales of the Winchester '92. At the start of World War II, Winchester dropped production when it retooled for the war effort. Winchester ended production of the Model 1892 in 1941, but Model '92 manufacture was taken up in the 1970s by Amadeo Rossi in Brazil; more recently by Chiappa Firearms, an Italian factory; by Browning in Japan; and by Winchester in Japan. In its modern form, using updated materials and production techniques, the Model 1892's action is strong enough to chamber high-pressure handgun rounds, such as .357 Magnum, .44 Magnum, and .454 Casull. Despite being designed for smaller cartridges, the 1892's dual forward locking-block action is actually stronger than Browning's rear-locked Model 1894.

== Modern copies ==
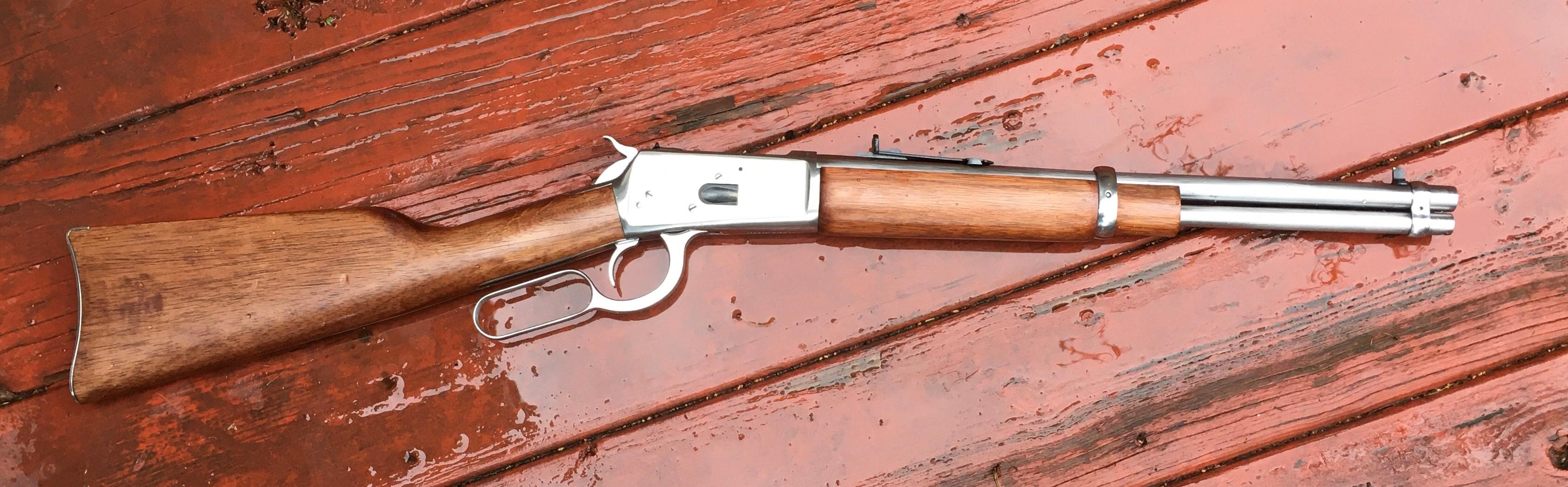
A Rossi R92 clone with a 16 in (406 mm) barrel chambered in .357 Magnum

Garate, Anitua y Cia of Eibar, Spain copied the Model 1892 as Tigre in .44 Largo (.44-40 Win.) with a 22-inch barrel, 12 shot magazine, military sights, and saddle ring. Many were made with sling swivels. Production between 1915 and 1937 totalled 1,034,687 rifles. From 1923 on they were issued to various Spanish services including the Guardia Civil. Tigre carbines were exported in large numbers to South American countries, and to the U.S. in the 1950s.

Winchester ended production of the Model 1892 in 1941; however, arms manufacturers such as Browning, Chiappa and Rossi have continued to produce copies. Versions of the Model 1892 have continued to be produced almost continuously since Winchester ended its production run. They range in quality and price from midrange firearms to highly decorated presentation pieces.

Winchester produced limited numbers of the Model 1892 in 1997. In November, 2006, Winchester announced the Model 1892 John Wayne 100th Anniversary Rifle, chambered in Win 44–40. Since then, Winchester has offered several versions of the Model 1892. In early 2012, Winchester produced a limited number of Large Loop Carbines in 4 calibers; .44 Magnum, .357 Magnum, .44-40 (44 WCF) and .45 Colt.

== The Rifleman's Winchester Model 1892 ==
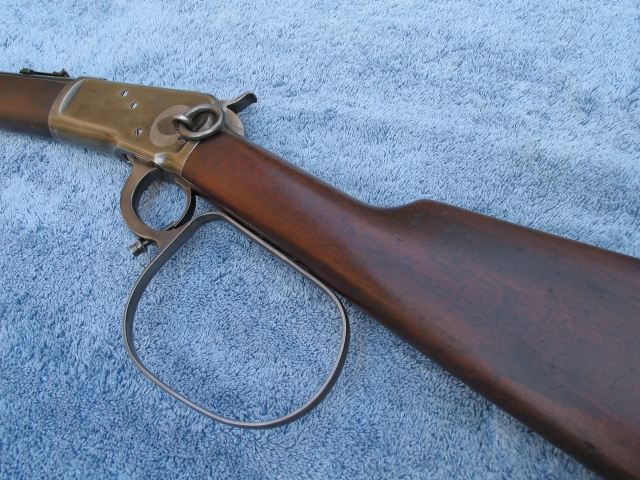
Large over-sized lever on the Rifleman's rifle

Westerns were popular when the television show The Rifleman premiered in 1958, and producers tried to find gimmicks to distinguish one show from another. The Rifleman's gimmick was a modified Winchester Model 1892 rifle, with a large ring lever drilled and tapped for a set screw. The lever design allowed him to cock the rifle by spinning it around his hand. In addition, the screw could be positioned to depress the trigger every time he worked the lever, allowing for rapid fire; as a result, he emptied the magazine in under five seconds during the opening credits.

The trigger-trip screw pin was used in two configurations: with the screw head turned inside (close to the trigger), or more often, outside the trigger guard with a locknut on the outside (to secure its position). In some episodes, the screw was removed when rapid-fire action was not required. When properly adjusted, the screw pulled the trigger when the lever was fully closed. The rapid-fire mechanism was originally designed to keep the program's star, Chuck Connors, from puncturing his finger with the trigger as he quickly cycled the action of the rifle. With this modification, Connors pulling the trigger for each shot was not necessary, so he did not have to place his finger in harm's way.

The large-loop rifle is also associated with John Wayne, who used a .44-40 Winchester '92 version in many films. Winchester, Rossi Firearms, Chiappa Firearms, Henry Repeating Arms and Marlin Firearms all make modern lever-action rifles with oversized loops (although the Henry and Marlin versions are not Winchester copies).

== Mare's Leg ==
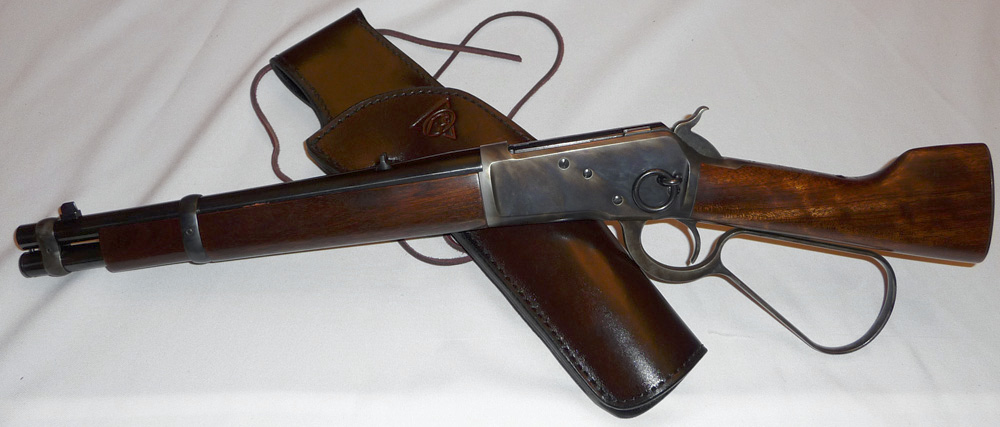
Puma Bounty Hunter pistol and holster

The Mare's Leg is the name given to a customized by "Von Dutch" (Kenny Howard), shortened rifle used by Steve McQueen's character on the television series Wanted: Dead or Alive (1958–1961). Mare's Leg is now a generic term for a Winchester Model 1892 (or modern derivative) with a shortened barrel and stock. These modern guns are made by Rossi, Chiappa, and Henry Repeating Arms (although the Henry versions are not Winchester copies). They are all considered handguns, as they are newly manufactured as handguns and sold subject to handgun regulations, rather than cut-down rifles, as such they avoid legal difficulties. In Canada, however, where handguns are classed as restricted, the "Mares Leg", as well as short shotguns, are non-restricted long guns.

== Popular culture ==
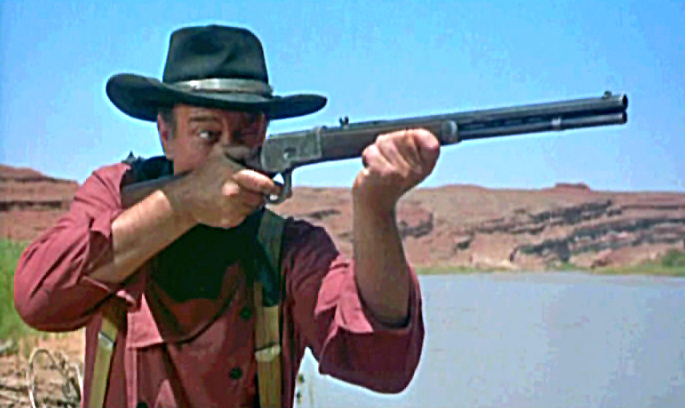
John Wayne aims a Model 92 rifle in The Searchers.

Although the Model 1892 made its debut after the closing of the American frontier, and the true "Guns that Won the West" were the earlier Models 1866 and 1873, it nonetheless became an icon of Western mythology through its use in hundreds of motion pictures and television shows, standing in for its older siblings. John Wayne famously carried Model '92s in dozens of films, and owned several personally, some with the distinctive oversized "loop" lever. Other notable screen '92s were those of Chuck Connors in The Rifleman and Steve McQueen in Wanted: Dead or Alive.

Hollywood studios purchased the '92 in quantity because it was in regular production (until World War II), but looked sufficiently like Old West Winchesters to substitute for valuable antiques, and because in calibers .44-40 and .38-40 it could fire, together with the Colt Single Action Army "Peacemaker" revolver, the standard 5-in-1 blank cartridge. This latter practice mirrored the real cowboys, who found it convenient to carry a rifle (carbine) and a revolver chambered with the same ammunition.

== See also ==
- Colt Lightning Carbine
- El Tigre Rifle
- The Rifleman's Rifle
- Winchester rifle
