= Tigre (rifle) =

Tigre Rifle
- Type: Rifle
- Place of origin: Spain

Service history
- In service: 1923–1980s
- Used by: Guardia Civil, Guardas Jurados, Guardia Foral, Patrimonio Nacional, Guardia Forestal, Dirección General de Instituciones Penitenciarias (prison service)
- Wars: Spanish Civil War

Production history
- Designer: John Moses Browning and other
- Designed: 1892
- Manufacturer: Gárate y Anitua Cia
- Produced: 1915–1937
- No. built: 1,034,687

Specifications
- Mass: 2.9 kg
- Length: 99.5 cm
- Barrel length: 55.2 cm
- Caliber: .44-40 Winchester
- Action: Lever-action
- Feed system: 12 round tube magazine
- Sights: Tangent leaf sights up to 1000 metres, Fixed-blade front sight

The Tigre rifle was a Spanish copy of the Winchester Model 1892 made by Garate, Anitua y Cia., an Eibar arms manufacturer between 1915 and 1938.

== Background ==
The intensive marketing efforts of the Winchester company's agent in Spain during the 1870s and 1880s may have led to the Tigre's popularity in Spain. These efforts included a visit by Oliver Winchester to Spain and other countries. After exhaustive testing and many design changes, 230 Winchester Model 1873 carbines (with 22 inch barrels, metre sights, full length cleaning rod and full stock) were sold to the Spanish Military for use by the Cavalry and Royal Bodyguard in the 1870s. These are considered to be evolutionary predecessors of the Winchester 1876 carbines, most famously supplied to the North-West Mounted Police. More than 2,500 were later made under license by the Spanish arsenal at Oviedo in the 1890s to keep staff working while awaiting the arrival of modern machinery required for the production of the Mauser Model 1893. These utilised some improvements made in the Winchester 1876, but were chambered in .44-40 thus allowing a slimmer action. Carbine variants were made for the Cavalry, and the 14th regiment of the Guardia Civil. Musket variants were made for some other users, such as Military academies and sentries. After 1893 a further unknown number of carbines were sourced from Eibar based firms, but these, according to Madis, were of lower quality than the Oviedo made models.

== Genesis and production history ==
The first models were produced by Gárate y Anitua in 1915, but production was presumably interrupted by the war. Having spent most of World War I supplying the Allies with large-framed revolvers based on Smith & Wesson designs and the 7.65mm Browning calibre self-loading Ruby pistols, the company began to market the first El Tigre rifles in 1923.

The El Tigre rifles were again chambered for the Winchester .44-40 cartridge (known in Spain as the .44 Largo) and had a 22-inch round profiled barrel (like the previous 1873/1876 carbines) marked with the makers name, calibre, and the trademark image of a Tiger. The stock was of Spanish walnut with a 12 3/4" Length of Pull and a crescent shaped metal butt plate with a trapdoor fitted for storage of a jointed cleaning rod in the butt. A drift-adjusted blade front sight was fitted, usually attached to the front barrel band in accordance with old Spanish practice. A military tangent leaf rear sight was fitted which was similar to those on the Mauser 1893 rifle and sighted to 1000 metres.

The El Tigre was made for both Civilian and Police use, but apart from its emergency use during the Spanish Civil War it was never issued as a military weapon. Over one million were eventually produced for private sale (mainly hunters), forest rangers, and for police, prison or private security guards who needed a compact but long-ranged weapon for use in confined spaces (e.g., the Railway division of the Guardia Civil). Certainly the .44-40 cartridge was adequate for hunting most Spanish game animals. Many were also exported to Latin American police agencies or prisons, leading to the widespread misconception that the El Tigre was made in Mexico or some other Latin American country.

The El Tigre was replaced in service starting in the 1940s by bolt action carbines such as the Destroyer carbine and Submachine guns which were chambered for the 9mm Largo service cartridge. Large numbers were exported as surplus to the US in the 1950s and 1960s, corresponding with the growth of interest in Western history and arms collecting.

El Tigre rifles often appear in photographs of the Spanish Civil War, usually in the hands of militia, police, or rear echelon forces. The pattern of carbine is mentioned in George Orwell's memoir Homage to Catalonia.
