= Rossi R92 =

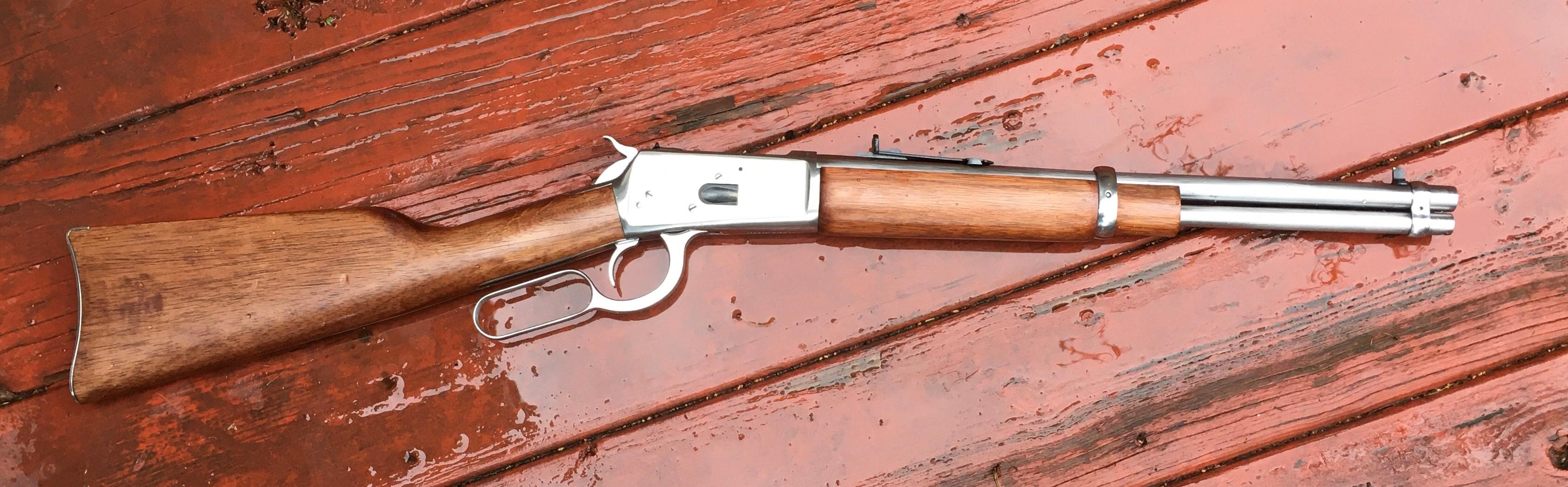
Rossi R92 carbine in .357 Magnum

Rossi R92 is a lever-action repeating rifle of Brazilian arms manufacturer Amadeo Rossi produced for export by Taurus Armas.

The Rossi R92 is a copy of the Winchester 1892 chambered in .357 Magnum/.38 Special, .454 Casull/.45 Colt, .44 Magnum/.44 Special/.44 Russian, and .44-40 Winchester.

Priced at below $1000 in the US market, the rifle is noted for its affordability compared to similar models from other manufacturers.

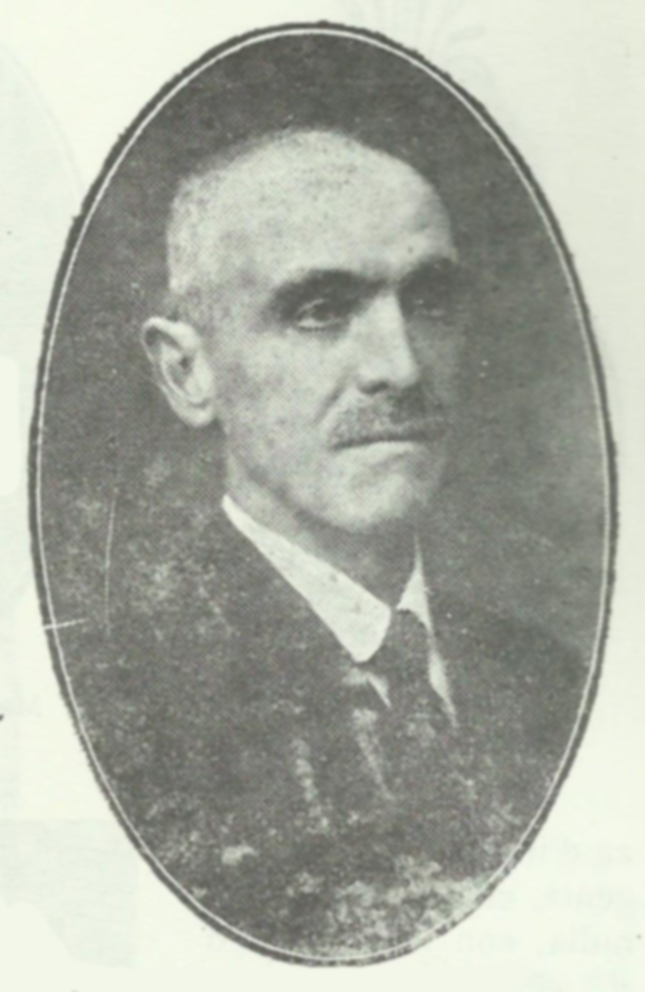
Amadeo Rossi (15 May 1862 — 18 January 1956)
