= Ruger Blackhawk =

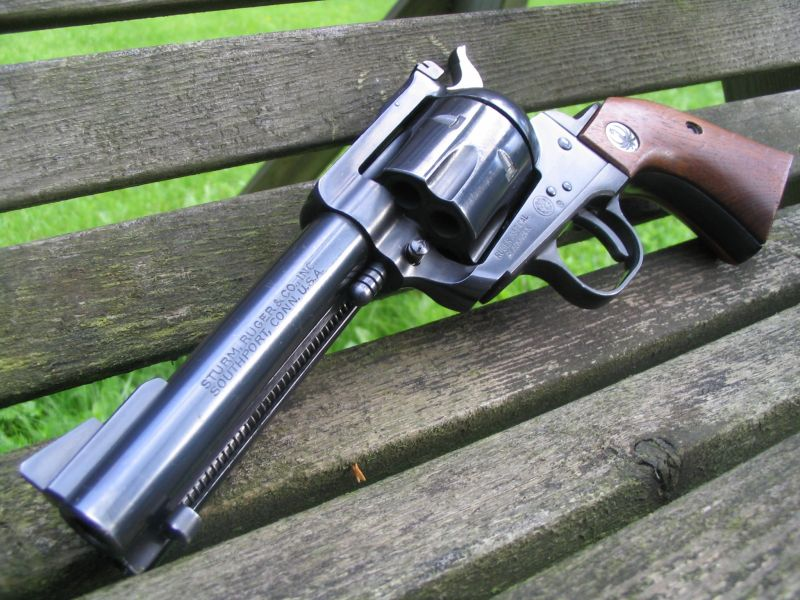
- A .357 Magnum/9mm convertible Ruger Blackhawk in blued finish, with Adjustable Sights, and a 4 5/8" Barrel
- Type: Revolver
- Place of origin: United States

Production history
- Manufacturer: Sturm, Ruger
- Produced: 1955–present
- No. built: 2 million

Specifications
- Mass: 36–48 oz (1,021–1,361 g)
- Length: 10 1/4–13 1/2 inches (260–343 mm)
- Barrel length: 4 5/8–7 1/2 inches (117–191 mm)
- Cartridge: Varies, see Various models
- Action: Single-action revolver
- Feed system: 6-round cylinder

The Ruger Blackhawk is a six-shot, single-action revolver manufactured by Sturm, Ruger & Co. It is produced in a variety of finishes, calibers, and barrel lengths.

== History ==
In the early 1950s, Westerns were popular in movies and television. Colt had discontinued the iconic Single Action Army prior to World War II, and few single-action revolvers were available to meet market demand for cowboy-style revolvers. In 1953, the new firm of Sturm, Ruger & Company introduced the Single-Six, a .22 LR rimfire single-action revolver. The Single-Six proved to be a popular seller, leading Ruger to develop and market a centerfire revolver similar to the Single Action Army: the Ruger Blackhawk.

Ruger introduced the Blackhawk in 1955. Chambered for the .357 Magnum, the Blackhawk was a simple and strong design, and it sold well. In 1956, as Smith & Wesson was introducing the new .44 Magnum, Ruger quickly developed a variant of the Blackhawk in the new cartridge. Ruger achieved wide popularity with this firearm. The Blackhawk was both cheaper and more readily available than the Smith & Wesson Model 29 revolver. According to popular legend, Ruger was able to field a .44 Magnum revolver at nearly the same time as Smith & Wesson due to a Ruger employee finding expended .44 Magnum cartridge cases at a scrapyard and deducing that Smith & Wesson was about to launch a new cartridge.

The 1955–1962 Blackhawks are known today as the "Flattop" models, because their adjustable rear sights were not protected by "ears" extending up from the frame as later became standard. From 1962 through 1972, Ruger made the "Three Screw" Blackhawk in various calibers, so called by the number of screws visible on the side of the revolver.

The Flattop and Three Screw Rugers were modernized compared to the Colt Single Action Army, in that they had adjustable sights instead of the Colt's fixed sights, and they used wire coil springs instead of the Colt's flat leaf springs. Bill Ruger chose coil springs due to their greater durability, saying that it solved one of the primary weaknesses of the Colt design.

The early models of the Blackhawk still operated the same way as the Colt, in that the hammer was half-cocked to load and unload and that the firearm was not safe to carry with all six chambers loaded due to the hammer resting upon the sixth chamber. In 1973, in order to eliminate accidents occurring from the hammer jarring against a round loaded in the sixth chamber, Ruger introduced the New Model Blackhawk. The New Model Blackhawk did not require the hammer to be half-cocked for loading and unloading, and it employed a transfer bar mechanism which prevented the cartridge under the hammer from being fired without the trigger being pulled. The New Blackhawk was seen as limiting firearms accidents and legal liability. Ruger then began offering a retrofit program, offering free transfer bar conversions to earlier variants of the Blackhawk.

In October 2026, Ruger announced the discontinuation of the Blackhawk, along with several other firearms to focus on models like the RXM and Security-9 handguns, and Mini-14 and 10/22 rifles.

== Performance ==
The Super Blackhawk is capable of operating with much higher pressure handloads than factory produced ammunition in .44 Magnum. Factory produced loads such as Federal Champion 240 gr JSP loads are right around 800 ft-lbs muzzle energy. Loads in excess of 1200 ft-lbs muzzle energy are commonly produced by handloaders for this caliber and the Super Blackhawk can, in fact, handle more powerful loads than any .44 Magnum lever action rifle and substantially more powerful rounds than any double action .44 Magnum revolver.

The Ruger Super Blackhawk can be used for handgun hunting. It is capable of reliably taking down deer, elk, caribou, moose, lion, grizzly or brown bear and even cape buffalo. It is commonly used to deliver a coup de grace shot to mortally wounded large game, having the ability to dispatch even an elephant with a conscientiously placed close range shot to the head. The wide availability of .44 Magnum cases and bullets make the .44 Magnum chambering far more practical than .454 Casull or .480 Ruger, while allowing for similar ballistics in custom loadings.

The Ruger Super Blackhawk in .44 Magnum is used for target shooting. Work is commonly performed on the action of these revolvers to give a lighter trigger pull, which can contribute to accuracy.

== Various models ==
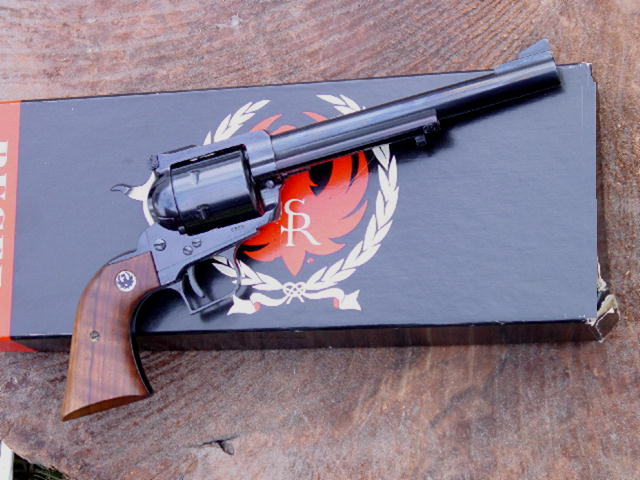
Ruger Old Model Super Blackhawk

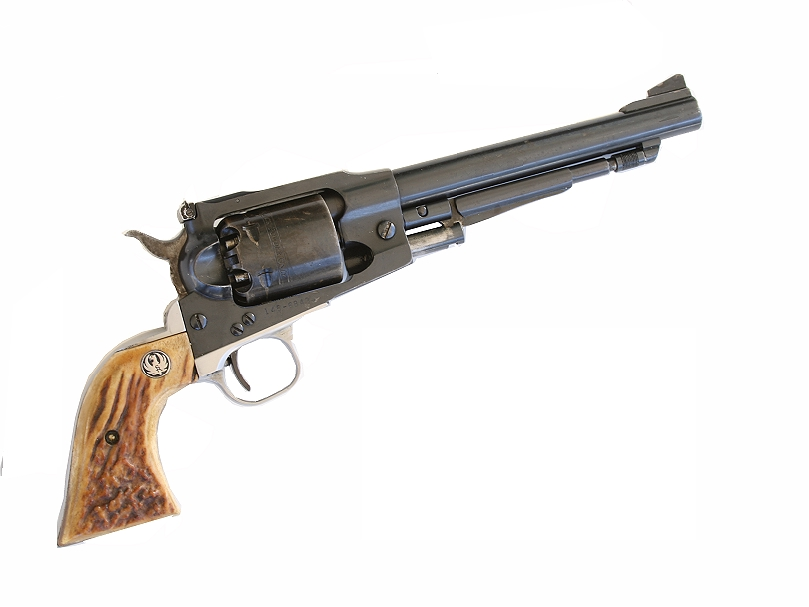
The Ruger Old Army is a 45-caliber percussion revolver based on the Ruger Blackhawk action.

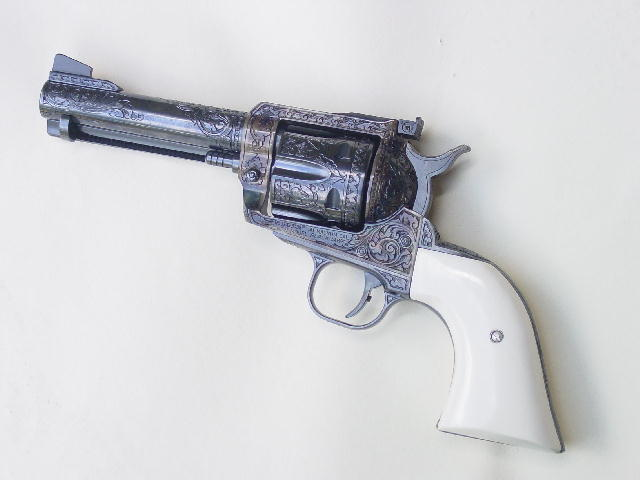
The Blackhawk is a popular base gun for custom work. This one is a cooperative effort by members of the American Pistolsmith's Guild.

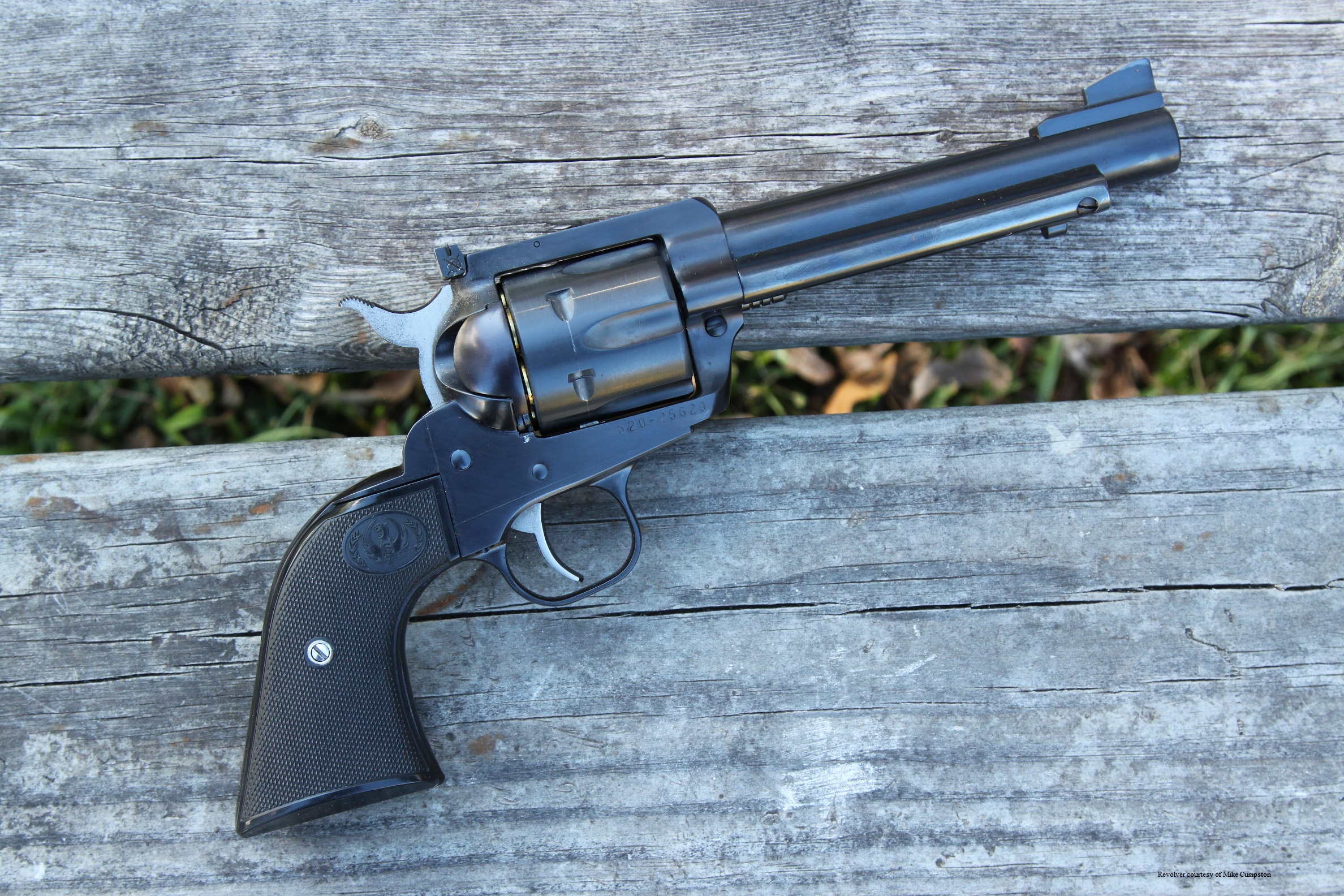
Variation of Ruger Blackhawk of all-steel construction and a number of retro features including .357-size frame and steel micro sight. There is a Bisley Grip Variation and a selection of calibers-.44 Special pictured.

Over the years the Blackhawk has appeared in a wide variety of models. These models include:

- New Model Blackhawk: Produced in blued steel in .30 Carbine, .357 Magnum, .41 Remington Magnum, .44 Special, and .45 Colt; produced in stainless in .327 Federal Magnum with an 8-round cylinder, .357 Magnum, and .45 Colt. Multiple barrel lengths were offered in many of these configurations.
- New Model Blackhawk Convertible: The cylinder of a Blackhawk is easily removed, and can be replaced with a cylinder for a different cartridge of the same diameter. Ruger has offered "convertible" cylinder revolvers in .45 Colt/.45 ACP, .38-40/10mm Auto, and .357 Magnum/9×19mm Parabellum. Other than being sold with multiple cylinders, these firearms are identical to the Blackhawk.
- New Model Super Blackhawk: Produced in blued and stainless, with or without a rib for mounting a scope. The Super Blackhawk is built on the same frame, but with a larger grip (in the 7.5" and 10.5" barrels) and unfluted cylinder (except for 5.5" barrel), in order to more effectively deal with the .44 Magnum's recoil. Also, the grip frames are made of steel, versus aluminium for those same components in the Blackhawk. Ejector rod housings were originally steel on old model Super Blackhawks. The new model stainless steel versions have steel ejector rod housings.
- Vaquero and New Vaquero: With the popularity of Cowboy Action Shooting came demand for a single-action revolver that was more traditional in appearance. As the standard Ruger Blackhawk departs from the Single Action Army looks due to its adjustable sights, Ruger offered a fixed-sight equivalent to cater to buyers wanting a more traditional appearance. In all other ways, the Vaquero was identical to the Blackhawk, though offered in slightly fewer variants. The original Vaquero was offered in .357 Magnum, .44 Magnum, and .45 Colt. After some time, Ruger went with a smaller frame to more closely resemble the actual size of the Colt SAA, changed the name to the New Vaquero, and dropped the powerful .44 Magnum from the lineup. While keeping the smaller size, Ruger later went back to the simple Vaquero name.
- Bisley: The Bisley grip is a type of angled grip developed by Colt for target shooting at the end of the 19th century. Ruger's "Bisley" offerings incorporated a Bisley-style grip, hammer spur, and trigger.
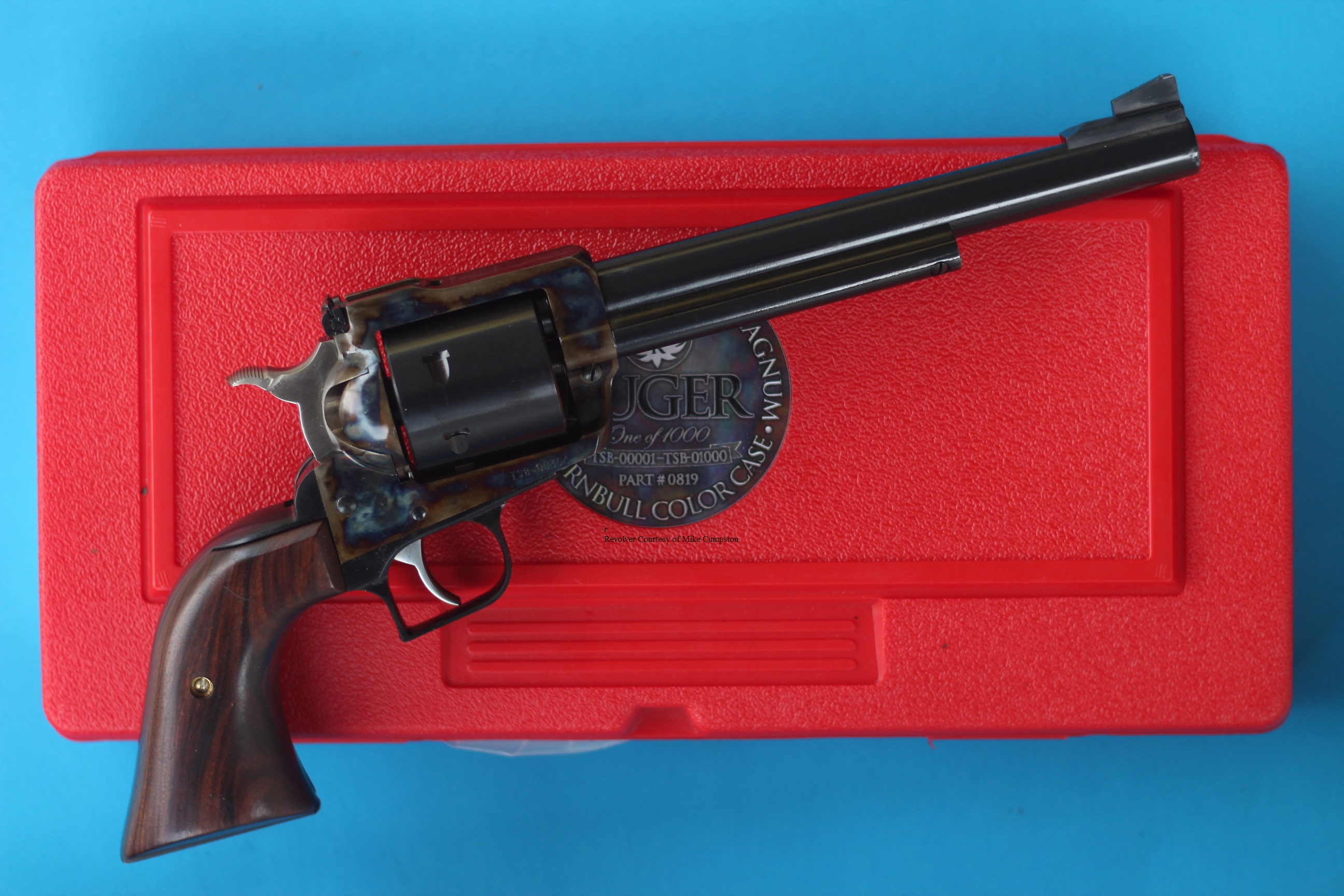
  A limited edition of 1,000 units from TALO Distributions featuring Turnbull Restorations Case Hardened frame.
  The Bisley features a down-turned grip inspired by the old #5 single-action army grip made up for Elmer Keith by gunsmith Harold Croft in 1929, although it is larger in size. This was in turn inspired by the classic 1894 Colt Bisley revolver, so named after the famous English shooting range at Bisley which was the site of many notable shooting matches in the late 19th century and is still in regular use. The Ruger Bisley has become a popular platform for conversion to even larger calibers by custom gunsmiths such as Gary Reeder, John Linebaugh, and Hamilton Bowen.
- Old Army: The Old Army is a percussion ("cap and ball") black powder revolver based on the Blackhawk frame.

== In popular culture ==
The character James Bond illegally owns a Ruger .44 Super Blackhawk in the 1981 novel Licence Renewed by John Gardner. Additionally, in the 1997 video game Goldeneye 007, one of the weapons, the Cougar Magnum, is based on the Ruger Blackhawk.

== See also ==
- Table of handgun and rifle cartridges
