= 5-in-1 blank cartridge =

Simulation ammunition for the film industry

Five-in-One Blank
- Type: Blank
- Place of origin: USA

Specifications
- Parent case: .38-40 Winchester.44-40 Winchester.45 Colt.44 Magnum.44 Special.410 bore
- Case type: Rimmed, bottleneck or Rimmed, straight
- Rim diameter: 13.1 mm (0.52 in)
- Case length: 33 mm (1.3 in)
- Overall length: 33 mm (1.3 in)

5-in-1 blanks (commonly called "five-in-ones" in the film industry) are blank cartridges that can be used in a variety of firearms. They are specifically made for theatrical use and are commonly used in real firearms for dramatic effect. Since the loud report and flash of ignition, and not the projection of a bullet, is the goal of the cartridge, it can be used in firearms with different bore sizes. These cartridges can be loaded with different charges, ranging from quarter-load charges for indoor scenes and scenes around animals, up to full-load charges for outdoor firing.

5-in-1 blanks can be used in firearms chambered for the .38-40 Winchester, .44-40 Winchester, .45 Colt, .44 Magnum, and .44 Special because, although the bores differ in diameter, the chambers are of similar shape. They were called a 5-in-1 blanks, because, when they were originally introduced, they could be fired in the five different firearms commonly used in Hollywood Westerns, namely .38-40 and .44-40 Winchester lever-action rifles and .38-40 Winchester, .44-40 Winchester, and .45 Colt single-action revolvers. 5-in-1 blanks are also called a 3-in-1 blanks for the three weapon calibers in which they are fired, namely .38-40 Winchester, .44-40 Winchester, and .45 Colt.

The 5-in-1 blanks in use today have been redesigned and are made with plastic cases that can be used not only in .38-40 Winchester, .44-40 Winchester, and .45 Colt calibers, but also in .44 Special, .44 Magnum, and .410 bore shotguns & revolvers. They are available in crimped and open-ended (balloon) varieties and are made using both black powder and smokeless powder. The black powder blanks produce not only a loud report and flash, but also a cloud of white smoke.

== See also ==
- List of rimmed cartridges

== Sources ==
- — Sporting Arms and Ammunition Manufacturers' Institute
