= Rossi Model 971 =

- Type: Revolver
- Place of origin: Brazil

Production history
- Manufacturer: Rossi Firearm Company

Specifications
- Mass: 1lb 14oz
- Length: 9.125 in (23.2 cm)

The Rossi Model 971 is a revolver manufactured by the Rossi Firearm Company of Brazil, which was owned by the Interarms Firearms of Alexandria, Virginia.

== Description ==
The 971 is offered in calibers .38 Special +P and .357 Magnum only. The revolver is double-action and it fires six rounds per load. It weighs 1 lb. 14oz. It is 9-1/8" long (depending on barrel length) and it is 5-7/16" high. It is made of steel and its finish is blued. The 971 was also manufactured in a stainless steel model. The 971's sights are adjustable and its sight radius is 5-15/16".

== Variants ==
Along with the 971 Rossi also produces the Model 972. This is a polished stainless steel version of the 971 with a 6" barrel length. Both revolvers have a rubberized finger-groove grip and adjustable rear sight (both windage and elevation). The 971 and 972 are both produced in Brazil by Taurus Firearms Ltd. under license from Rossi USA.

Both the models 971 and 972 are certified for use with .38 Special +P rounds, and had a limited lifetime warranty through Rossi USA.
