= Ruger Vaquero =

Six-shot single-action revolver

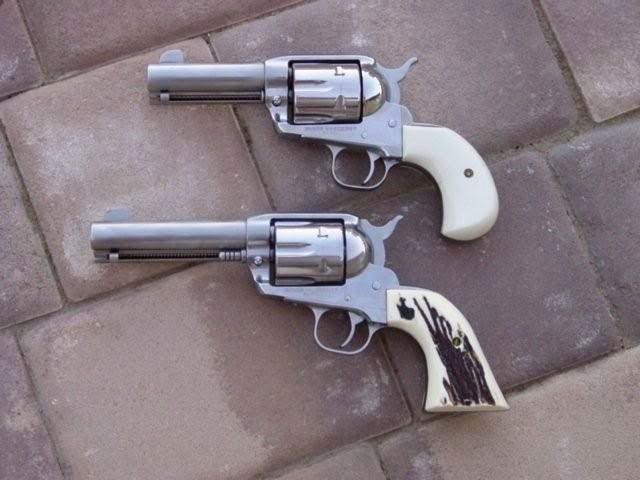
- Two Ruger Vaqueroes in Stainless Steel
- Type: Revolver
- Place of origin: United States

Production history
- Designer: Bill Ruger Sr.
- Designed: 1993
- Manufacturer: Sturm, Ruger
- Produced: 1993–present
- No. built: 650,000
- Variants: Convertible, Montado, Bisley

Specifications
- Mass: 36–48 oz (1,000–1,400 g)
- Length: 9.5–13 in (240–330 mm)
- Barrel length: 3.75 in (95 mm), 4.62 in (117 mm), 5.5 in (140 mm), 7.5 in (190 mm)
- Caliber: .357 Magnum/.38 Special; .44-40 Winchester; .44 Magnum/.44 Special; .45 Colt
- Action: Single-action revolver
- Feed system: 6-round cylinder
- Sights: Fixed

The Ruger Vaquero is a six-shot single-action revolver manufactured by Sturm, Ruger & Co. based on the New Model Ruger Blackhawk frame and was introduced in 1993. It comes in blued steel, case colored, and a gloss stainless finish (the latter gloss stainless finish is intended to resemble closely a 19th-century nickel-plated finish), all of which are available with wood, hard rubber, simulated ivory or black micarta grips and fixed sights. It arose with the popularity of Cowboy Action Shooting from which came demand for a single-action revolver that was more traditional in appearance.

== Design details ==
The Ruger Vaquero is a New Model Blackhawk with fixed sights consisting of a front blade and a notch milled into the frame at the rear. The first version was a 7 1/2 in (190 mm) barrelled revolver chambered in .45 Colt with a simulated color case-hardened frame and a blue barrel, grip frame, and cylinder. This was followed by models with a 5 1/2 in (140 mm) barrel and a 4 5/8 in (120 mm) barrel based on the other common barrel lengths of the Colt SAA. The three versions were offered in stainless steel and other calibers including .44 Magnum, .357 Magnum, and .44-40 Winchester. Originally all Ruger Vaqueros were shipped with walnut grips incorporating a Ruger logo in a medallion. In 1998 some models began shipping with a faux-ivory grip and limited runs with gold inlay and engraving were offered.

Like the New Model Blackhawk the Vaquero does not require the hammer to be half-cocked for loading and unloading, and uses a transfer bar mechanism which prevents the cartridge under the hammer from being fired without the trigger being pulled.

The "New Model Vaquero" comes with checkered black plastic grips, which look similar to the checkered black rubber grips Colt used in the late 19th century. Ruger placed the safety warning which used to appear on the left-side of the barrel beneath the barrel on these models to make the gun more aesthetically pleasing.

== Variants ==
Two major variants of Vaqueros exist. The original Vaquero was marketed from 1993 until 2005, and was slightly larger than the Colt Single Action Army. The New Vaquero, produced from 2005 to the present is closer to the dimensions of the Colt Single Action Army. Unlike original Single Action Army revolvers, both versions are safe to load all six chambers of the cylinder, having a transfer bar design; additionally, both variants permit reloading by simply opening the loading gate, thereby freeing the cylinder to rotate freely, without pulling the hammer into the half-cock notch. These initial Vaqueros have only two hammer positions: fully down, and fully cocked.

The original Vaquero was built to safely fire higher pressure 45 Colt ammunition than the Black powder chamberings, having significantly thicker cylinder walls than other revolvers. Many reloading manuals contain Ruger-only recommended handloads that are considered unsafe for use in other than Thompson/Center pistols, Ruger Blackhawk revolvers, Ruger Redhawk revolvers, and Ruger Vaquero revolvers. Ruger New Vaquero model revolvers, having thinner cylinder walls, are not considered safe for use with the Ruger-only loads taken from the older editions of these manuals. Ruger states that the "New Model Vaquero" will handle +P and +P+ ammunition without any issues, but warns users not to shoot reloads in any of their guns as it will void the warranty.

Three grip variants exist for Vaqueros. The standard grip is very similar to the grip on the original Single Action Army revolver. The Bisley variant incorporates the target grip that was incorporated on the Bisley variant of the Single Action Army revolver that was intended for target shooting. The Bisley grip is also better suited for users with larger hands, having a longer frame that better fits larger hands. Users with smaller hands may not find the trigger to be comfortable to shoot on Bisley variants, by reason of not being able to place their trigger finger properly on the trigger, the trigger being located farther from the grip. The third variant is the Birdshead grip, similar to the pattern found on the Colt M1877 and M1878 models.

In 1999 a limited run of 500 guns in stainless steel and 500 guns in blue with color case hardened frames were offered by Davidson's with a 3 3/4 in (95 mm) barrel and a shortened ejector rod and housing. These were called the "Sheriff's Model". In 2005, this barrel was added as a standard option to the catalog.

== History ==
The Vaquero was introduced in 1993 to meet the growing demand for quality modern firearms used in the growing sport of cowboy action shooting.

In 2005, Ruger introduced the "New Vaquero" which incorporated a smaller frame, based on Ruger's XR-3 grip frame, making the pistol closer to the size of the Colt Single Action Army Revolver of 1873. The New Vaquero will accept two-piece stocks made for the Colt Single Action Army.

== Calibers ==
- .32-20 WCF/.32 H&R Magnum
- .357 Magnum/.38 Special
- .44-40 Winchester
- .44 Magnum
- .45 ACP
- .45 Colt

The Firearms Distributor known as Davidson's offered three exclusive chamberings of the Vaquero with convertible cylinders:

- .357 Magnum/9 mm Convertible
- .45 Colt/.45 ACP Convertible
- .38-40 Winchester/.40 S&W Convertible

== San Diego Sheriff's Association .40 S&W model ==
In 2000, the San Diego Sheriff's Association ordered a Commemorative Edition Vaquero chambered in .40 S&W (the caliber of the SDSA's service weapon), to celebrate the agency's 150th anniversary. Approximately 1,000 models were produced, most of which were sold to SDSA members embossed with their logo on the barrel. Around 125 were overruns and sold lacking such markings; particularly sought after by collectors are 25-30 of said overruns in which the user warning traditionally stamped on the left side of the barrel was instead stamped on the underside of the barrel.
