= Rossi R46102 =

Type of revolver

Rossi Model 461
- Type: Revolver
- Place of origin: Brazil

Production history
- Manufacturer: Rossi Firearm Company
- Variants: 1

Specifications
- Mass: 26 Ounces
- Length: 6.5"
- Caliber: .357 Magnum and .38 Special
- Barrels: 2"
- Action: Double Action/Single Action
- Feed system: 6 shots
- Sights: Fixed

The Rossi Model 461 is a revolver manufactured by the Rossi Firearms company.

== Description ==
The 461 is offered in calibers .357 Magnum and .38 Special +P only. The revolver is double action and it fires six rounds per load. It weighs 26 oz. (1 lb. 10 oz.). It is 6-1/2" long. It is made of steel and its finish is blued. The 461's sights are fixed gutter revolver sights.

There is a known issue with the 461 model, in that the firing pin can break off if the revolver is dry fired. However, replacement parts are available, albeit not directly sold by Rossi manufacturers themselves. In 2019, Taurus Armas agreed to pay $38 million to settle allegations that Rossi revolvers are prone to fire if dropped due to a manufacturing defect. The affected units are those with serial numbers beginning with the letters A, B, C, D, E, F, G, H, I, J, K, Y, or Z, manufactured between January 1, 2005, and December 31, 2017.

== Variants ==
Along with the 461 Rossi also produces the Model 462. This is a polished stainless steel version of the 461. Both revolvers have a 2" barrel, a rubberized finger-groove grip, and fixed sights. The 461 and 462 are both produced in Brazil by Taurus Firearms Ltd. under license from Rossi USA.

Both the models 461 and 462 are certified for use with .38 Special +P rounds, and have a limited lifetime warranty through Rossi USA.

== See also ==
- Rossi R97206
