= Ruger Old Army =

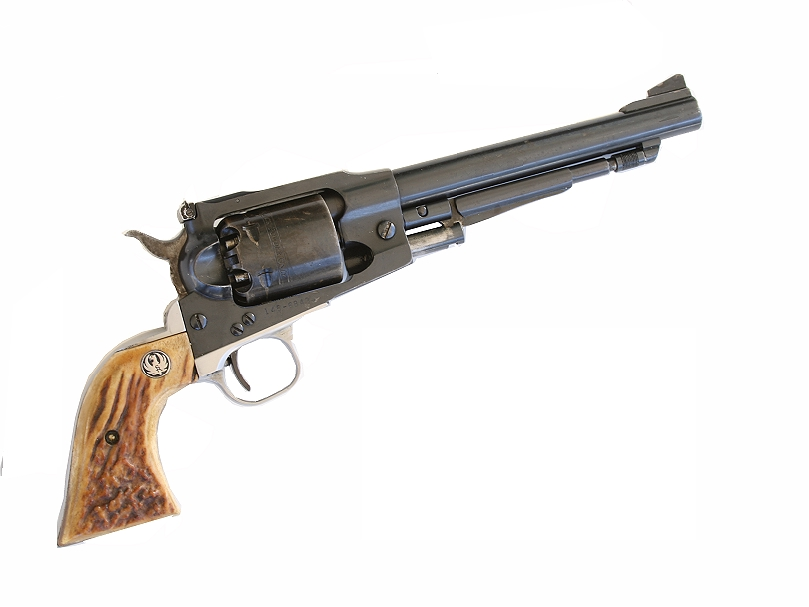
- Type: Revolver
- Place of origin: United States

Production history
- Manufacturer: Sturm, Ruger & Co.
- Produced: 1972–2008

Specifications
- Barrel length: 7.5" barrel
- Cartridge: Black Powder; Cap & Ball
- Caliber: .44
- Action: Single Action Revolver
- Feed system: 6-shot Cylinder

The Ruger Old Army is a black-powder percussion revolver introduced in 1972 by the Sturm, Ruger company and manufactured through 2008. Models were available with either a 5.5 in (140 mm) or 7.5 in (190 mm) barrel.

== Design ==
The Ruger Old Army revolver is unusual in that, unlike most percussion revolvers on the market, it was not based on a historical design, but was a modification of Ruger's Blackhawk model, which was itself based upon the cartridge-firing Colt Peacemaker. The Old Army revolver accordingly incorporates many modern design features, though employing antiquated black-powder component loading.

This design was built around the Blackhawk, but it takes its styling cues from the Spiller and Burr cap and ball pistol. This is due to the frame being longer in front to accommodate the loading lever and pivot pin. Earlier models were listed as .44 caliber, later as .45, but all use a .457 in (11.6 mm) round ball or .454 in (11.5 mm) conical lead bullet. The Ruger Old Army can also shoot modern smokeless cartridges in .45 Colt (.45 Long Colt), or .45 ACP loaded for "cowboy action" muzzle velocities less than about 850 feet per second, via use of a drop-in conversion cylinder made by a number of manufacturers.

Unlike the Blackhawk, the Old Army did not make use of Ruger's transfer bar safety; instead the revolver relied upon a series of safety notches between each chamber on the cylinder like some models of the Remington/Colt or other black powder revolvers of the mid-19th century had.

The revolver was tested by loading each chamber to capacity with Bullseye smokeless powder and a lead ball. While this might result in catastrophic failure in other firearms, the Old Army proved to be strong enough to handle the pressure.

== Variants ==
The Old Army was made in blued steel and stainless steel. The first series of revolvers, made between 1972 and 1981 (with serial numbers 140-000000 to 140-46841) were all blued. Beginning in 1982, stainless versions were produced as well, beginning with serial number 145-00000. Originally fitted with adjustable sights, fixed-sight models were first offered in 1994. A 5.5 in (140 mm) barrel was introduced in 2002. Some versions were sold with polymer ivory grips. Barrels of Ruger Old Army revolvers made in 1976 were marked "MADE IN THE 200TH YEAR OF AMERICAN LIBERTY".

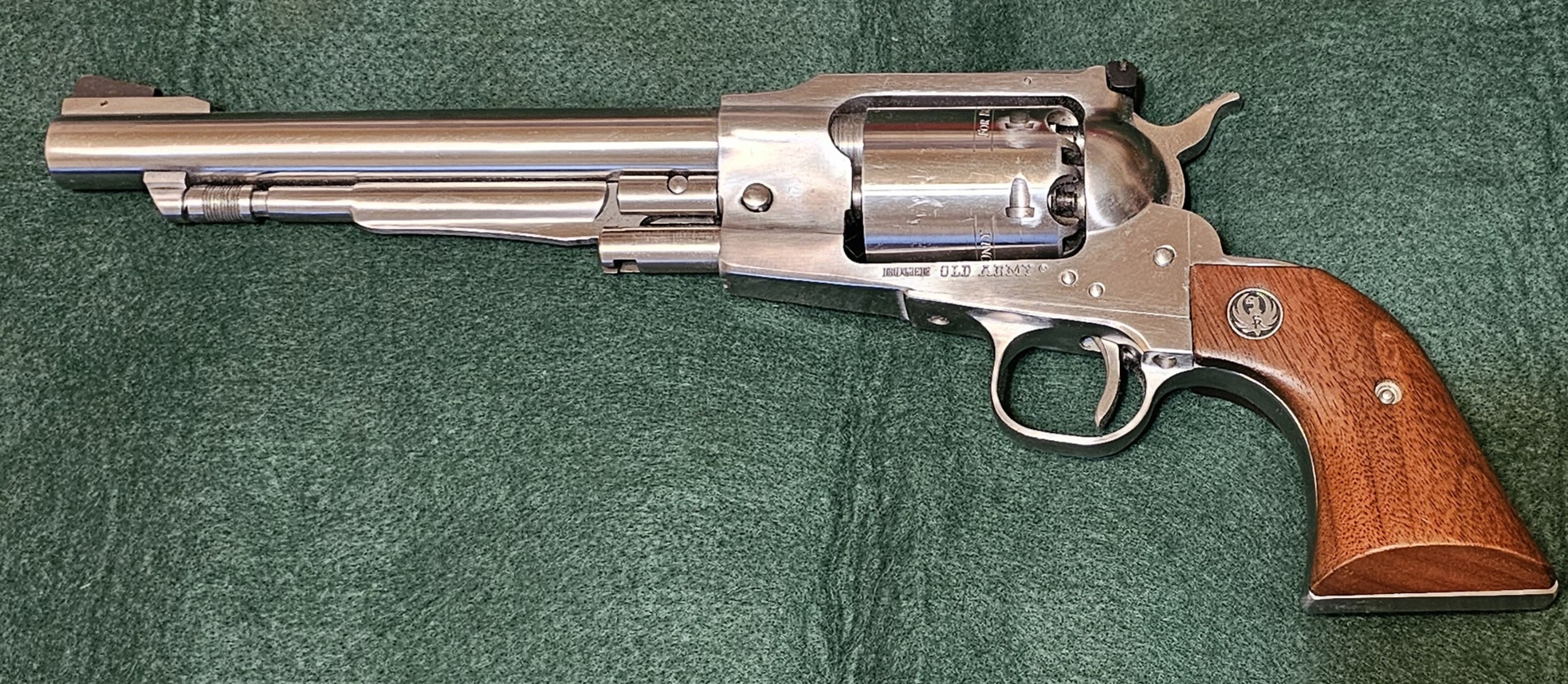
Ruger Old Army stainless steel model
