= Pistola Herval =

- Type: Pistol

Production history
- Designer: Manuel Luís Osório, Marquis of Erval
- Manufacturer: Fábrica de Armas da Conceição
- Produced: 1879
- No. built: 3-5

Specifications
- Mass: 1.36 kg
- Caliber: 10.7mm
- Muzzle velocity: 380 meters per second
- Effective firing range: 50 meters
- Sights: n/a

The Pistola Herval was a lever action pistol manufactured in Brazil. The weapon was a prototype intended for mounted cavalry troops.

== History ==
The Pistola Herval, which got its name due to its construction having been ordered by the Marquis of Herval (General Osório), when he was the Minister of War (1879), is nothing more than a Winchester 1873, reduced, and modified in order to simplify it: for example, the amount of components has been reduced from 31 to 19.

A very small number of them (three were certainly made, less than five in total, it is assumed) were handcrafted at the Fábrica de Armas da Conceição, not being adopted. Despite being purely experimental, and also the result of a modification of an existing weapon, it appears in several documents and books, perhaps due to the fact that it came from a personal intervention by General Osório, hero of the Paraguayan War.

One example survives today, in the Army Museum, Fort Copacabana.

== See also ==
- List of pistols
- Short-barreled rifle
- Carbine
- Mare's Leg - Fictional equivalent.
