= Amadeo Rossi =

Brazilian firearm manufacturer

Amadeo Rossi S.A.
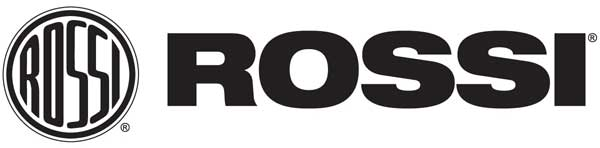
- Type: Sociedade Anônima
- Industry: Defense
- Founded: 1889; 137 years ago
- Founder: Amadeo Rossi
- Headquarters: São Leopoldo, Brazil
- Key people: Luciano Von H Rossi
- Products: Firearms, weapons
- Number of employees: 500
- Website: www.rossi.com.br

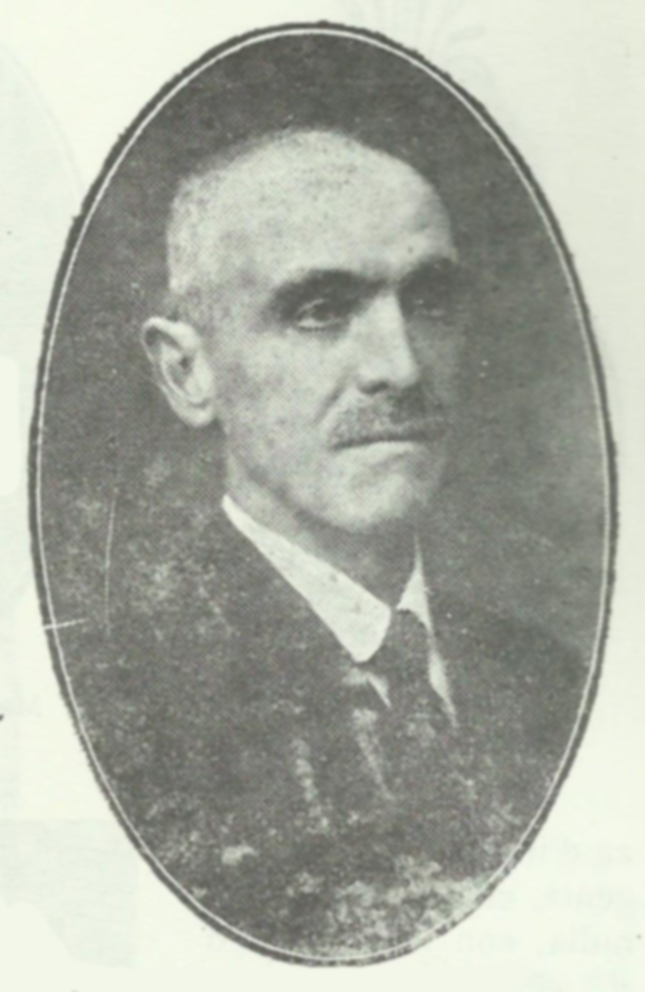
Amadeo Rossi (15 May 1862 — 18 January 1956)

Amadeo Rossi S.A. (or simply Rossi) is a Brazilian firearms manufacturer founded in 1889 in São Leopoldo, Brazil. Rossi produces pistols and revolvers used by both civilians and security forces, and exports worldwide. It is considered one of the largest weapons manufacturers in Brazil.

== About ==
The Rossi company was established in 1889 by the Italian gunsmith Amadeo Rossi (Belluno, May 15, 1862 — São Leopoldo, January 18, 1956). In the 1970s, Rossis began to be distributed in the United States by Interarms Virginia. This continued until 1997, when Rossi founded BrazTech, their own subsidiary representative in North America . Their revolvers had great popularity in the United States, Canada, and some countries in Europe.

The production line of revolvers and handguns was acquired by Taurus. Rossi currently produces revolvers, hunting rifles, shotguns and traditional line of Puma rifles. It also has a line of own airgun, known as Rossi Dione.

Since 2010, Rossi no longer produces firearms for sale in the Brazilian market, and dedicates itself exclusively to the importation and distribution of airguns and airsoft, a sport that remains popular in Brazil since its legalization. Rossi guns can still be found in the foreign market, made by Amadeo Rossi exclusively for export, or by Taurus.

In Brazil, Rossi distributes the airgun brands Beeman, Hatsan, SAG, Zoraki, Crosman, among others, besides airsofts brands HFC, CQB, Swiss Arms and Crossman.

=== Models ===
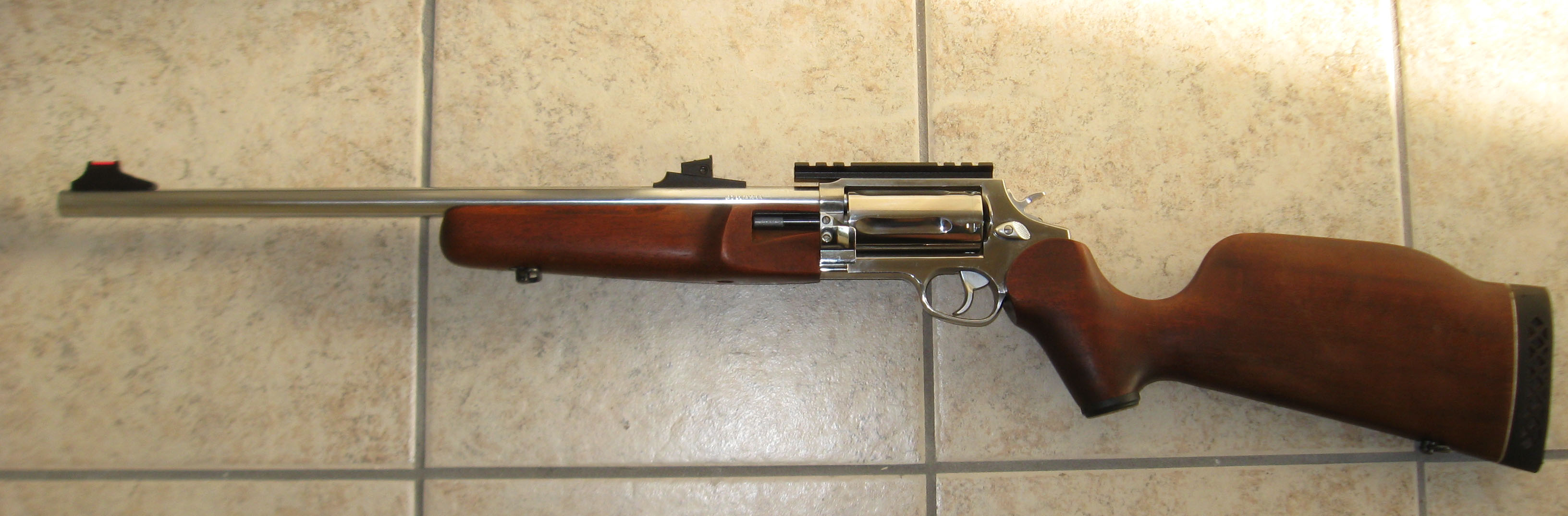
Rossi Circuit Judge carbine

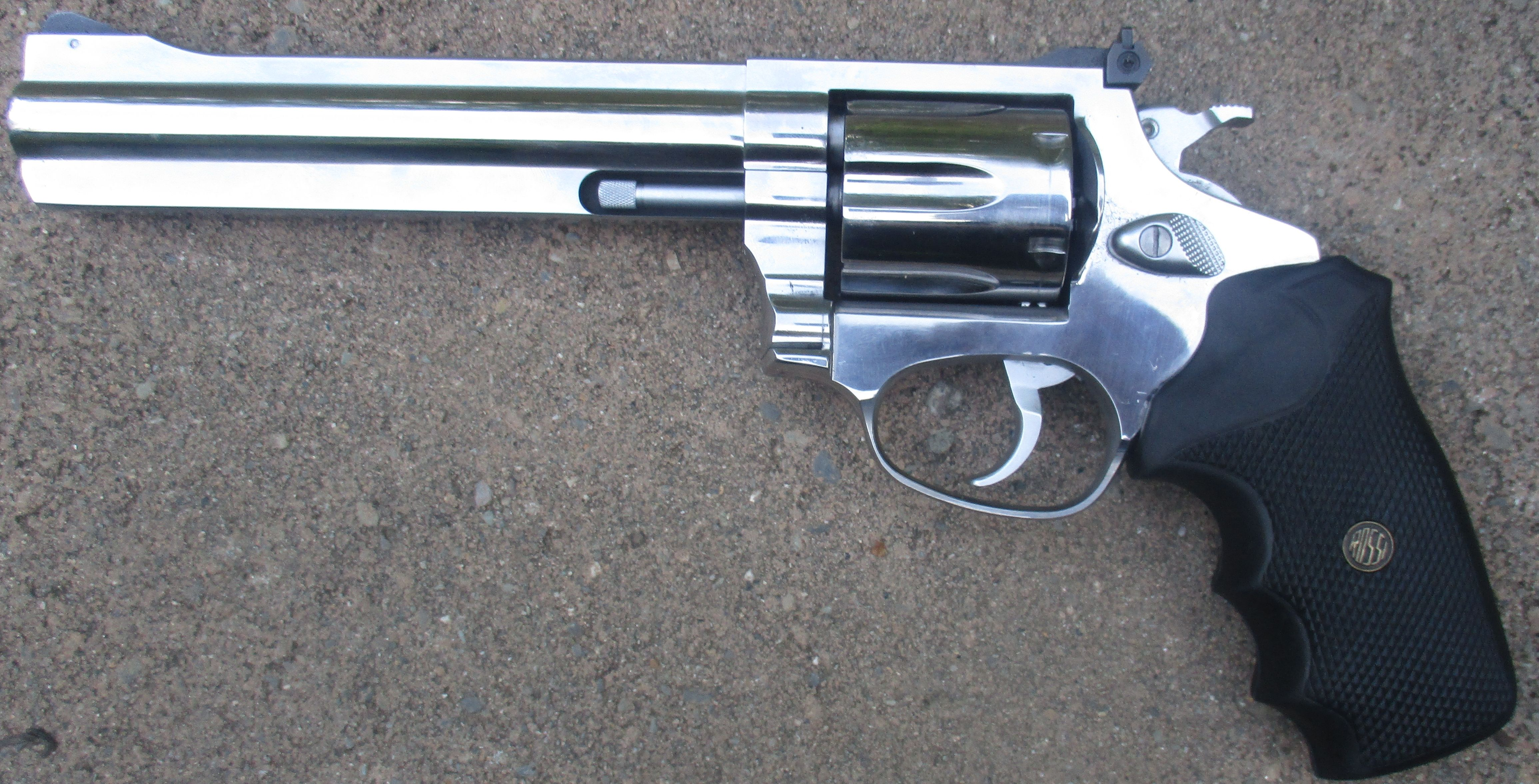
Rossi 972 revolver

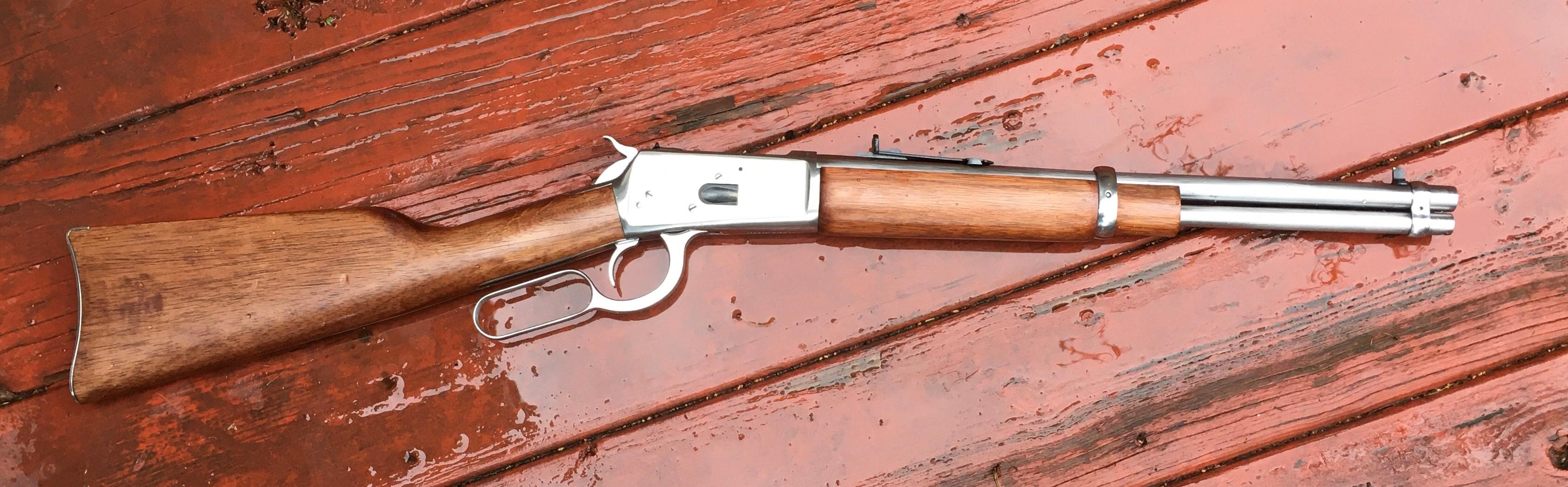
Rossi R92 carbine in .357 Magnum

Rossi 62 in .22 LR. (Copy of the Winchester 62.)

- Rossi Model 971 .357 Magnum/.38 Special
- Rossi Model 986 Cyclops
- Rossi Model 13 “Princess” (.22 LR)
- Rossi R46102 .357 Magnum/.38 Special
- Rossi R35102 .38 Special
- Rossi R85104 .38 Special
- Rossi R46202 .357 Magnum/.38 Special
- Rossi R35202 .38 Special
- Rossi R97206 .357 Magnum/.38 Special
- Rossi Circuit Judge .410-bore/45LC & .22 LR (carbine)
- Rossi Tuffy is a single shot .410-bore shotgun. It features a half thumb-hole stock that holds four additional shot-shells and strongly resembles the original Snake Charmer shotgun. Unlike its predecessor, it also has ejectors that automatically expel spent shells.
- Rossi R92, a copy of the Winchester 1892, chambered in .357 Magnum/.38 Special, .454 Casull/.45 Colt, .44 Magnum/.44 Special/.44 Russian, and .44-40 Winchester.
- Rossi RB22M .22 Magnum
- Rossi RB22 .22 LR
- Rossi RB17 .17 HMR
- Rossi RP63 .357 Magnum/.38 Special
- Rossi RM64 .357 Magnum/.38 Special
- Rossi RM66 .357 Magnum/.38 Special
- Rossi RM84 .38 Special
- Rossi RS22 .22LR
- Rossi RS22M .22 Magnum
- Rossi Brawler, a break top single shot pistol chambered in .45 Colt and .410 bore. Since the barrel is rifled, the Brawler is not typically considered a short barreled shotgun. It is, however, classified as such in California, and thus is illegal there.

== See also ==
- Taurus Armas
- IMBEL
