= Henry Repeating Arms =

American firearms manufacturer

- Type: Private
- Industry: Firearms
- Founded: 1996; 30 years ago in Brooklyn, New York
- Founders: Louis & Anthony Imperato
- Headquarters: Rice Lake, Wisconsin, United States
- Products: Rifles, Shotguns, Revolvers
- Owner: Anthony Imperato
- Website: www.henryusa.com

Henry Repeating Arms is a firearms manufacturing company. As of 2023, Henry Repeating Arms ranked in the top three of U.S. long gun manufacturers, and fifth of U.S. firearm manufacturers, producing over 400,000 firearms annually.

== History ==
=== Founding & Early Development (1996-2000) ===
Henry Repeating Arms was founded by Anthony Imperato and his father, Louis Imperato, in 1996 in Brooklyn, New York, after securing the trademark for the Henry brand. The name Henry Repeating Arms is inspired by Benjamin Tyler Henry, the inventor who patented the first repeating rifle in 1860, known as the Henry rifle. The company has no direct affiliation or historical connection to Benjamin Tyler Henry or to the New Haven Arms Company, which sold the original Henry rifle from 1862 to 1864. Henry Repeating Arms started with rimfire lever-action rifles but eventually expanded to include centerfire designs, shotguns, and handguns. The first rifle model, the H001 Classic Lever Action .22, was shipped in March of 1997. Two years later, the flagship Golden Boy model was introduced.

The original company motto was: “Made in America and Priced Right.” The current company motto is: “Made in America, or Not Made at All.”

=== Growth & Expansion (2000-2013) ===
In 2006, certain assets of Wright Products, as well as their 140,000 square foot facility in Rice Lake, Wisconsin, were acquired by Anthony Imperato. Wright Products was a supplier of components to Henry Repeating Arms since 1998, but was ceasing operations. Henry Repeating Arms retained 17 employees, including Andy Wickstrom, then Director of Operations at Wright Products. In 2015, Wickstrom was promoted to Vice President and General Manager, and then announced as company President in 2021.

Henry Repeating Arms maintained its headquarters in Brooklyn until announcing they would move their company to Bayonne, New Jersey. In September 2008, the company moved from its 40,000 square foot Brooklyn facility to a building with 109,000 square feet and brought 95 employees with them. In 2012, the Bayonne facility sustained massive damage from Hurricane Sandy with three feet of saltwater across the building, including machinery and inventory. The company was able to resume operations in three months with the help of employees and vendors. In 2013, despite the damage the Bayonne facility sustained from Hurricane Sandy, the company reported it shipped 300,000 rifles and employed 300 people.

=== Manufacturing Expansion (2014-2025) ===
By 2014, Henry Repeating Arms expanded their operations in Wisconsin and began manufacturing complete steel centerfire rifles at its Rice Lake facility. In 2021, they bought a second manufacturing facility with 84,000 square feet on 13.5 acres in Ladysmith, Wisconsin. The new facility would be less than an hour away from the facility in Rice Lake and would employ over 100 people. In the spring of 2025, Henry Repeating Arms announced they would be moving their headquarters and all operations from New Jersey to Wisconsin. Their headquarters would move to the Rice Lake facility and manufacturing would move to their two facilities in Ladysmith, with a third facility rumored to be closing in the summer. With four facilities in Rice Lake and Ladysmith, the company is estimated to have about 400,000 square feet of manufacturing operations.

Henry Repeating Arms announced a new Special Products Division (SPD) in March of 2025 that would research advancements in firearms design and technology. This division would include research into different materials, metallurgy, and improved manufacturing processes.

=== Production Milestones ===
Henry Repeating Arms produced its first model, the Henry H001 Classic Lever Action .22, in March 1997. During their 20th anniversary in 2017, the company manufactured its one millionth H001 rifle.

In 2022, Henry Repeating Arms celebrated its 25th anniversary and donated 1,000 Golden Boy “Silver Anniversary” limited edition rifles to raise $1 million for its charity constituencies with Guns For Great Causes. They also manufactured other limited edition models, including a special edition New Original Henry and a 25th anniversary edition of the H001 Classic Lever Action .22.

In 2023, Henry Repeating Arms was ranked #5 in “Top 40 U.S. Manufacturers” and #3 in “U.S. Long-Gun Production” from NSSF-adjusted NICS data. The data reported the company had produced 8,626 pistols, 5,223 revolvers, 377,743 rifles, and 13,257 shotguns – making it a total of 404,849 firearms.

== Operations ==
Henry Repeating Arms employs over 800 people and operates three manufacturing facilities totaling more than 350,000 square feet. The company headquarters is located in Rice Lake, Wisconsin, and the other factories are in Bayonne, New Jersey, and Ladysmith, Wisconsin. Louis Imperato served as chairman of the company from its start in 1996 until his passing in November 2007. Anthony Imperato currently serves as the Founder & CEO, and Andy Wickstrom is the company president.

== Products ==
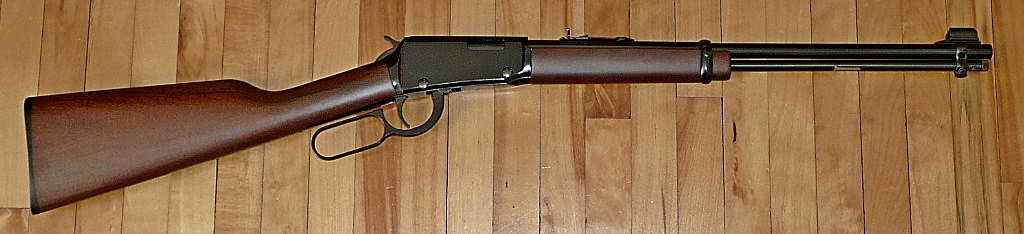
Henry H001 Classic Lever-Action .22LR

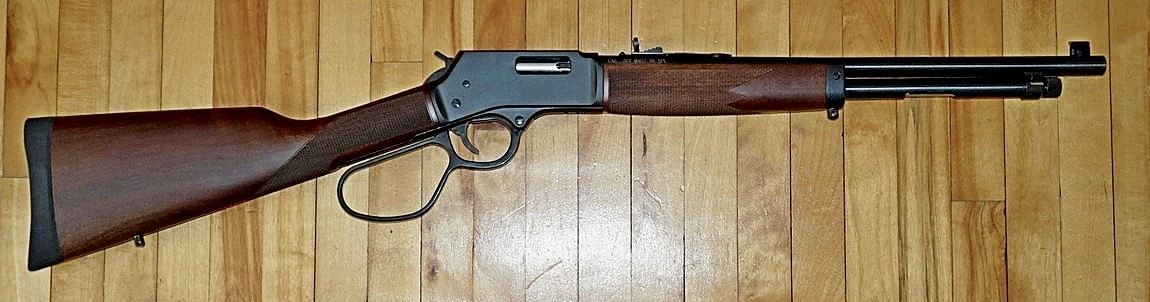
Henry Big Boy Steel Carbine .357 Magnum

Henry Homesteader Carbine in 9mm Luger

Henry Repeating Arms manufactures rifles, shotguns, and revolvers. The company produces a broad range of lever-action rifles in both rimfire and centerfire calibers, in a variety of finishes, including alloy, steel, hardened brass, hardened silver, color case hardened, and All-Weather.

The company’s signature model is the Henry Golden Boy, a rimfire lever-action whose moniker is "the gun that brings out the west in you." The company has sold over one million of its model H001 Lever-Action .22 rifle, which has become a staple of the firearms industry. The company donated serial number one million which was auctioned and raised over $50,000.

The Henry US Survival AR-7 is an updated version of the U.S. Air Force AR-7, a semiautomatic take-down .22LR designed so that all of the rifle's components fit into the buttstock.

The Henry Mini Bolt is a beginner's stainless steel single-shot .22 rifle that is the official youth rifle of the USA Shooting Team.

Henry Repeating Arms is the official firearms licensee of the Boy Scouts of America, and several Henry Boy Scout editions are available.

The Henry Single Shot Shotgun is available in hardened brass or steel in 12 and 20 gauge, and .410-bore.

Henry also manufactures a garden gun smoothbore in .22 long rifle, intended for pest control using only "snake shot" .22-caliber shotshells, like those commonly sold by CCI Ammunition.

In 2023, Henry released the Henry Homesteader, a 9mm pistol caliber carbine that has adapters to take their proprietary magazines, or certain GLOCK, SIG Sauer, or Smith & Wesson M&P magazines.

The Henry Single Shot rifle is also available in hardened brass or steel in over 10 centerfire calibers. Henry Repeating Arms released the Side-Gate lever-action rifle chambered in .30-30 Win, .38-55 Win, .35 Rem, and .45-70 Gov't in 2018. This is their first rifle to feature a loading gate allowing ammo to be loaded, reloaded, or topped off as needed from the rear of the tubular magazine. The gun can be unloaded quickly from the muzzle end of the tubular magazine.

In 2023, Henry introduced the Big Boy Revolver chambered in .357 Magnum with a brass square or rounded grip frame.

The Mare's Leg was introduced in 2011 in both a rimfire and centerfire versions. The rimfire version has 12.8-inch barrel and the centerfire version has a 12.9-inch barrel.

The Long Ranger, which was introduced in 2016 and uses a detachable box magazine and a 6-lug, rotary bolt head. The box magazine allows use of pointed bullets.

== Promotion ==
Henry Repeating Arms' corporate motto is "Made In America Or Not Made At All."

== Awards ==
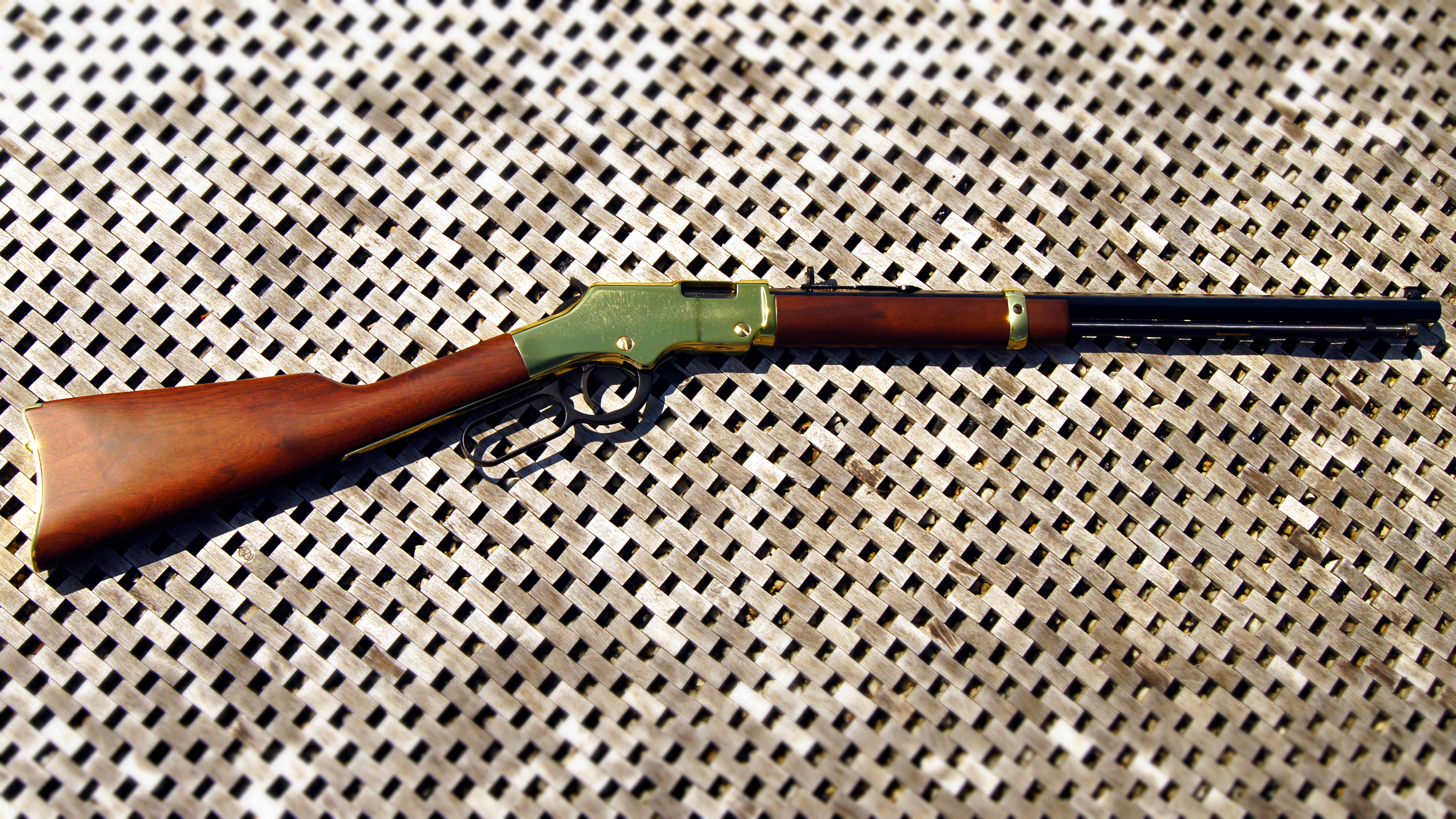
Henry H004 Golden Boy .22 S/L/LR

Henry Repeating Arms was recognized for exceptional customer service in June 2016 by the American Business Awards and received the Stevie Award for both Customer Service and Social Media. It is the only time a firearms company has received these awards.

Henry Repeating Arms was named 'Company of the Year' in Sporting Classics' 16th annual Awards of Excellence in 2018.

In 2019, the Henry Big Boy All-Weather rifle won the fourth annual "Coolest Thing Made in Wisconsin" bracket-style contest presented by Wisconsin Manufacturers & Commerce.

Henry Repeating Arms was awarded the 2021 Top Development Award by Momentum West, a Wisconsin regional economic development company, for its expansion in Ladysmith, Wisconsin.

== Events ==
Henry Repeating Arms held the Henry 1,000-Man Shoot in November 2016 at Ben Avery Shooting Center when 1,000 participants fired Henry Golden Boy rifles simultaneously.
