= Rossi R97206 =

Rossi Model R97206
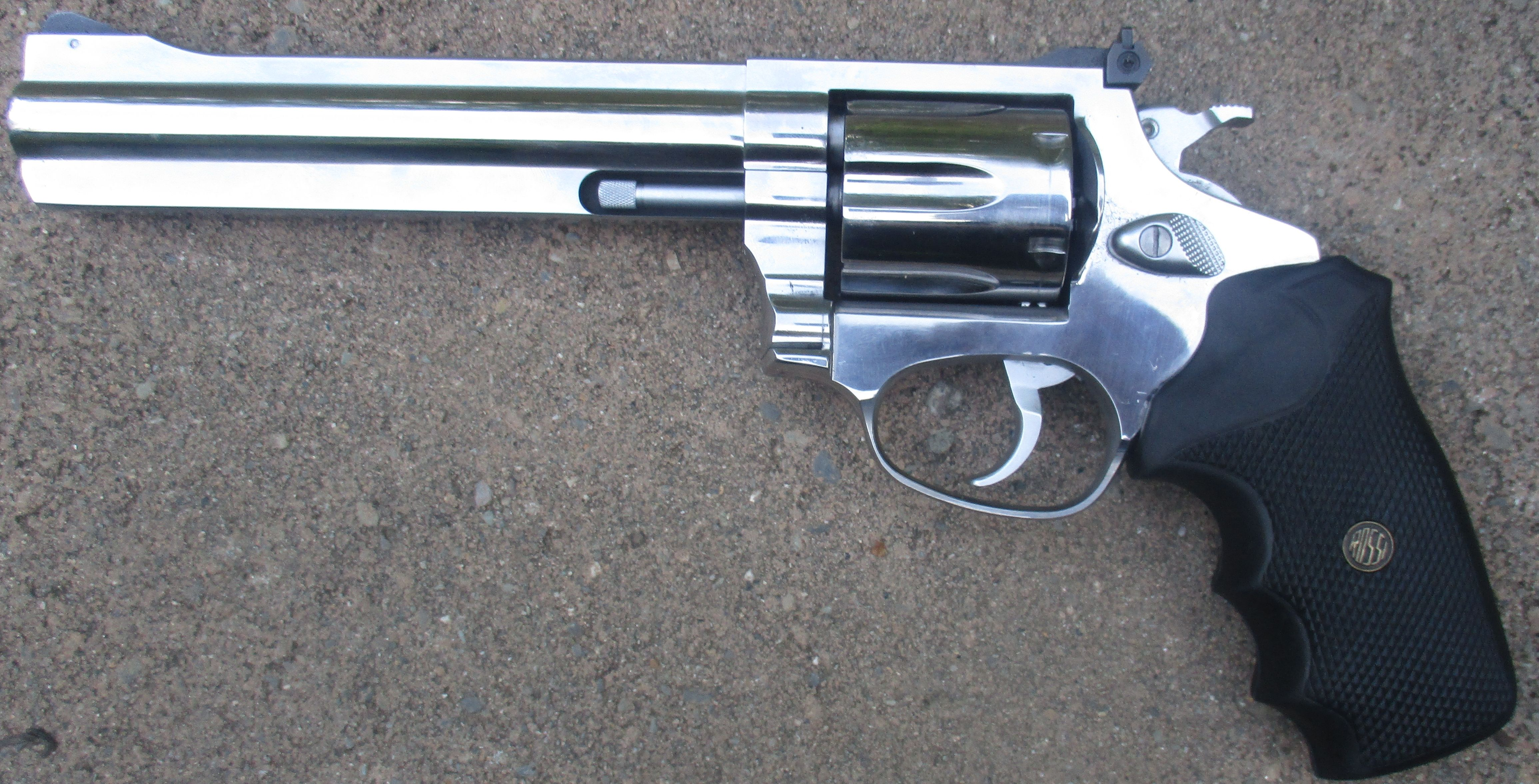
- Type: Revolver
- Place of origin: Brazil

Production history
- Manufacturer: Rossi Firearm Company
- Produced: 2001—present

Specifications
- Mass: 34.9 Ounces
- Length: 10.9"
- Barrel length: 6"
- Caliber: .38 Special / .357 Magnum
- Feed system: 6 shot cylinder
- Sights: Adjustable rear sight, high-visibility front sight

The Rossi Model 972 is a stainless-steel, 6-shot, double-action revolver, chambered in .357 Magnum. It was manufactured by Rossi Firearms of Brazil.
