= .38-40 Winchester =

American pistol cartridge

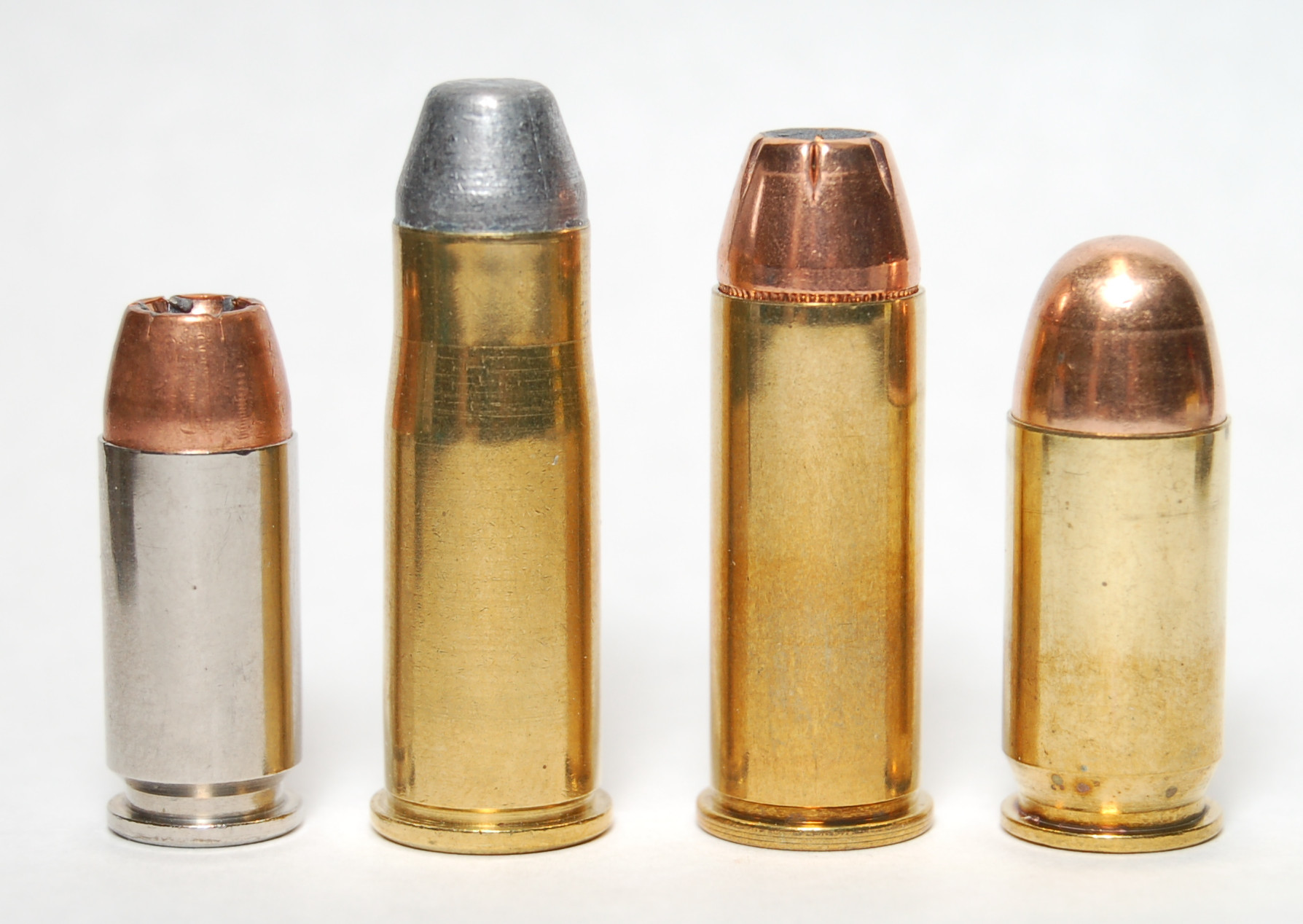
- .40 S&W, .38-40 Winchester .44 Special, and .45 ACP cartridges
- Type: Rifle, revolver
- Place of origin: United States

Production history
- Designer: Winchester Repeating Arms Company
- Produced: 1874–1937 (original production); 1993–present (current production)

Specifications
- Parent case: .44-40 Winchester
- Case type: Rimmed, bottleneck
- Bullet diameter: .4005 in (10.17 mm)
- Land diameter: .3941 in (10.01 mm)
- Neck diameter: .4167 in (10.58 mm)
- Shoulder diameter: .4543 in (11.54 mm)
- Base diameter: .4695 in (11.93 mm)
- Rim diameter: .525 in (13.3 mm)
- Rim thickness: .065 in (1.7 mm)
- Case length: 1.305 in (33.1 mm)
- Overall length: 1.59 in (40 mm)
- Maximum CUP: 14,000 CUP

Ballistic performance
Bullet mass/type	Velocity	Energy
180 gr (12 g) SP	1,160 ft/s (350 m/s)	538 ft⋅lbf (729 J)
- Sources: Cartridges of the World, 11th ed

The .38-40 Winchester (10.17x33mmR) is an intermediate cartridge shooting .401 in (10.2 mm) bullets. The cartridge was introduced by Winchester in 1874 and is derived from their .44-40. This cartridge was introduced for rifles, but in its reintroduction for cowboy action shooting it has seen some popularity as a revolver cartridge. It is not particularly well suited to hunting larger game, but it was popular when it was introduced, along with the previous .44-40, for deer hunting. It can be used successfully on smaller game animals, and for self-defense. Current loadings are intended for revolvers.

== Design and history ==
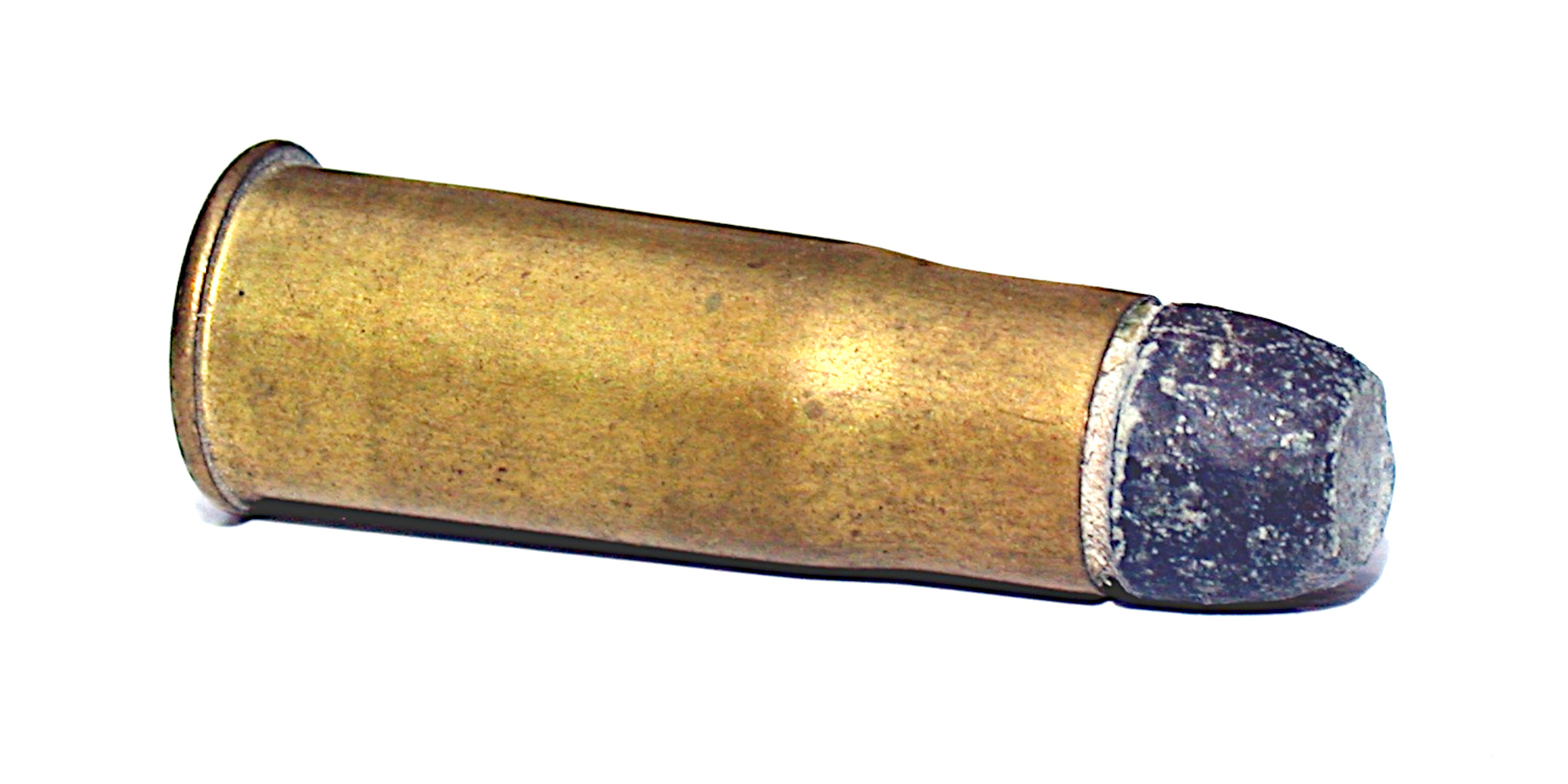
An old .38-40 Winchester sample

It is unclear why this cartridge was introduced, as it is very similar to the .44-40 from which it was derived. It has approximately 110 ft⋅lbf (150 J) less muzzle energy, and has a muzzle velocity about 110 ft/s (34 m/s) less than the .44-40. The bullet differs by only .026 inches in bullet diameter and 20 grains (1.3 g) in standard bullet weight from the original .44-40. The goal may have been to reduce recoil while maintaining a similar bullet sectional density. One unusual design element of this cartridge is that factory ammunition was loaded with a different case profile than the standard chamber for this cartridge, factory ammunition having a much longer neck than the standard chamber. Most reloading dies are designed to size fired brass to the chamber specification rather than that of the original factory ammunition case profile.

The renewed interest in this caliber can be explained by the increasing popularity of cowboy action shooting and metallic silhouette shooting. Several single-action revolvers have recently been chambered for this cartridge, including the Ruger Vaquero. Most modern reloading data for this cartridge is found in the handgun section of reloading manuals.

== Performance ==
Though introduced as an "all-around" cartridge, traditional sources suggest the .38–40 performs inadequately on deer. Ballistically, commercial 'cowboy' loads are similar to the much newer .40 S&W, sharing the bullet weight, and similar velocity. A limited number of hunting loads are available commercially, which produce about 25% more muzzle energy than the more common target ammunition.

== Dimensions ==
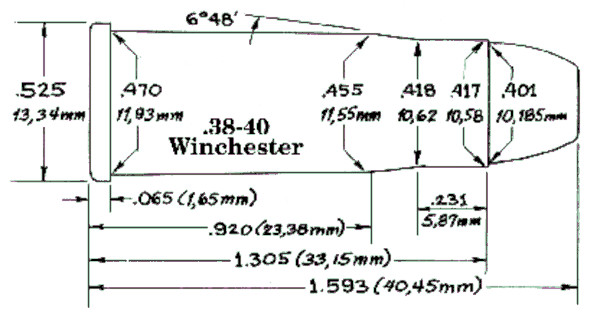

== Synonyms ==
- .38-40
- .38-40 WCF
- .38 CFW
- .38 WCF

== See also ==
- 10 mm caliber
- .40 S&W
- 10mm Auto
- .41 Action Express
- List of rimmed cartridges
- List of cartridges by caliber
- Table of handgun and rifle cartridges
