= .44-40 Winchester =

American firearms cartridge

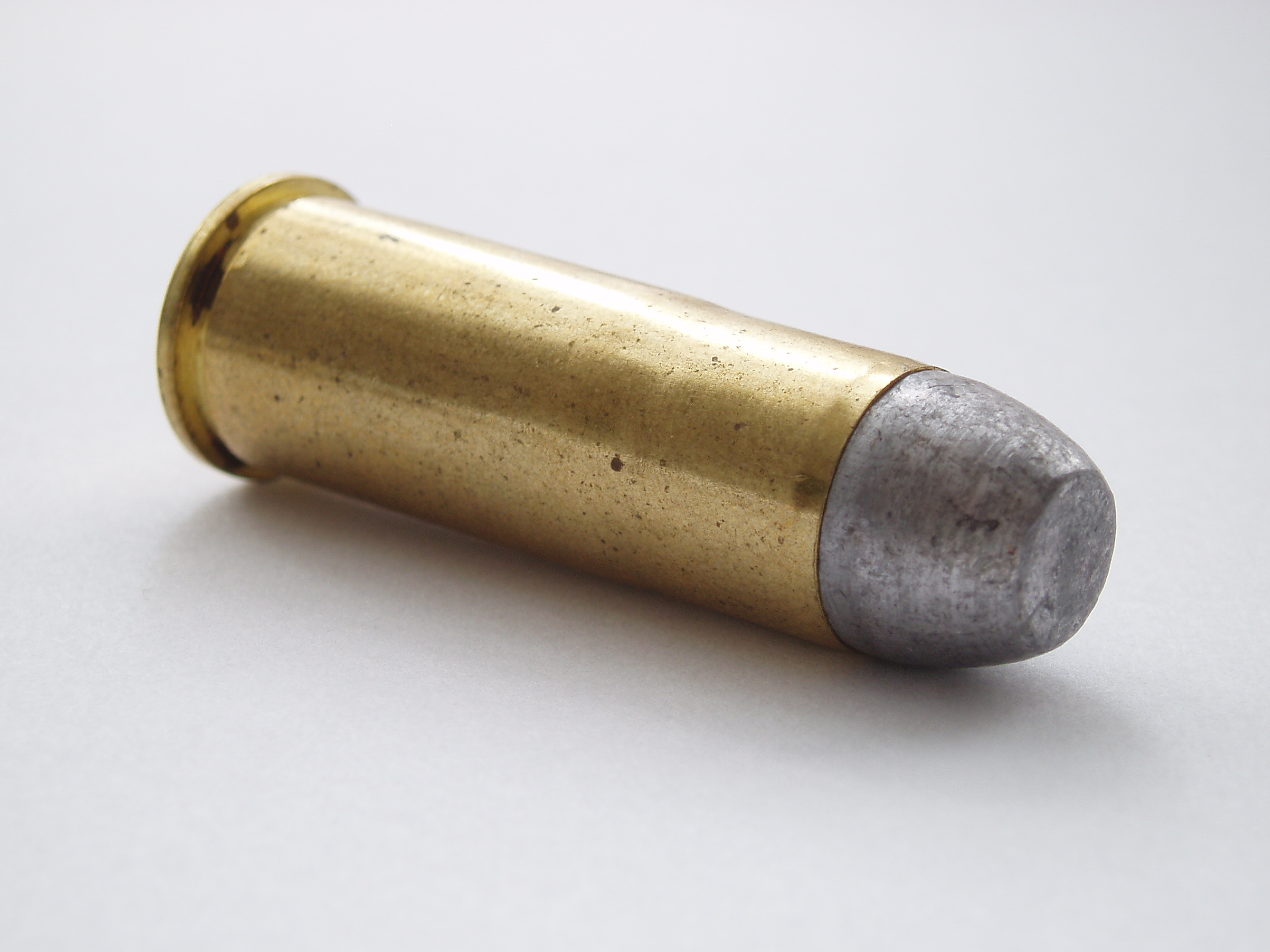
- .44-40 Winchester cartridge
- Type: Rifle, revolver
- Place of origin: United States

Production history
- Designer: Winchester Repeating Arms Company
- Designed: 1873
- Produced: 1873–present

Specifications
- Case type: Rimmed, straight-walled
- Bullet diameter: .429 in (10.9 mm)
- Neck diameter: .443 in (11.3 mm)
- Shoulder diameter: .458 in (11.6 mm)
- Base diameter: .471 in (12.0 mm)
- Rim diameter: .525 in (13.3 mm)
- Rim thickness: .065 in (1.7 mm)
- Case length: 1.305 in (33.1 mm)
- Overall length: 1.592 in (40.4 mm)
- Case capacity: 40 gr H_{2}O (2.6 cm^{3})
- Primer type: Large pistol
- Maximum pressure: 11,000 psi (75.84 MPa)
- Maximum CUP: 13,000 CUP

Ballistic performance
Bullet mass/type	Velocity	Energy
200 gr (13 g) lead	1,245 ft/s (379 m/s)	688 ft⋅lbf (933 J)
217 gr (14 g) lead	1,190 ft/s (360 m/s)	682 ft⋅lbf (925 J)
225 gr (15 g) lead	1,000 ft/s (300 m/s)	500 ft⋅lbf (680 J)
200 gr (13 g) lead	1,100 ft/s (340 m/s)	537 ft⋅lbf (728 J)
- Test barrel length: 20"; Source: Reloadersnest.com

The .44-40 Winchester (10.8×33mmR), also known as .44 Winchester, .44 WCF (Winchester Center Fire), is a .44 caliber centerfire small arms metallic cartridge introduced in 1873 by the Winchester Repeating Arms Company. It was the first of its kind manufactured by Winchester, and was promoted as the standard chambering for the new Winchester Model 1873 rifle. As both a rifle and a handgun caliber, the cartridge soon became widely popular, so much so that the Winchester Model 1873 rifle became known as "The gun that won the West."

== History ==
When Winchester released the new cartridge, many other firearm companies chambered their guns in the new round. Remington and Marlin released their own rifles and pistols which chambered the round, Colt offered an alternative chambering in its popular Single Action Army revolver in a model known as the Colt Frontier Six-Shooter, and Smith & Wesson began releasing their Smith & Wesson New Model 3 chambered in .44-40. Settlers, lawmen, and cowboys appreciated the convenience of being able to carry a single caliber of ammunition which they could fire in both pistol and rifle. In both law enforcement and hunting usage, the .44-40 became the most popular cartridge in the United States, and to this day has the reputation of killing more deer than any other save the .30-30 Winchester.

The cartridge was originally sold as a .44 Winchester (.44 W.C.F.) cartridge by Winchester. When the Union Metallic Cartridge Co. (UMC) began selling their own version of the cartridge, they adopted the name .44-40 (shorthand for .44 caliber and the standard load at the time of 40-grain (2.6 g) of black powder) at the request of the Marlin firearms company, as they did not want to offer free advertising for one of its competitors. Over time, the name stuck, and eventually Winchester adopted the .44-40 designation for the round after World War II. Winchester uses the designation "44-40 Winchester" on packaging.

== Technical background ==
The initial standard load for the cartridge was 40 grains (2.6 g) of black powder propelling a 200-grain (13 g) round-nose, flat-point bullet at roughly 1,245 ft/s (379 m/s). Winchester catalogues listed velocities of 1,300 ft/s (400 m/s) by 1875. In 1886, UMC also began offering a slightly heavier, 217-grain (14.1 g), bullet at 1,190 ft/s (360 m/s), also with 40 gr of black powder. Winchester soon began to carry the 217-gr loading, as well, but in 1905, UMC discontinued the heavier load. In 1895, Winchester introduced a 200-grain (13 g) cartridge bulk loaded with 17-grain (1.1 g) of DuPont No. 2 smokeless powder and a bullet for 1,300 ft/s (400 m/s), and in 1896, UMC followed suit with a 217-gr bullet at 1,235 ft/s (376 m/s). Soon, both companies were offering the cartridge with lead "metal patched" (i.e. copper-jacketed with lead points), and full metal jacket versions. Taking advantage of the stronger-action designs of the Winchester model 1892 and the Marlin 1894 lever-action rifles, in 1903, Winchester began offering a higher-performance version of the loading called the Winchester High Velocity (WHV), with a velocity of 1,540 ft/s (470 m/s) using a 200-gr copper-jacketed bullet from a 24-inch (610 mm) barrel length, UMC and Peters Cartridge Company soon introduced equivalents. Over the years, a number of different bullet weights and styles have been offered, including 122, 140, 160, 165, 166, 180, and 217 gr in lead, soft- and hollow-point, full metal case, blanks, and shot shells. The most common current loading is a 200-gr bullet at 1190 ft/s.

By 1942, more modern cartridges had all but eclipsed the .44-40, but it regained some popularity in the 1950s and 1960s when Colt began once again to manufacture the Single Action Army and Frontier. More recently, the .44-40 has had a resurgence due to the popularity of metallic silhouette and cowboy action shooting, which inspired the introduction of a low-velocity 225-grain (14.6 g) gallery load, the heaviest factory bullet ever available for the cartridge.

== In popular culture ==
The famed Winchester Model 1873 repeating rifle was chambered for WCF .44-40. To both celebrate and enhance its prestige, Winchester established a coveted "One of One Thousand" grade in 1875. Barrels producing unusually small groupings during test-firing were fitted to rifles with set triggers and a special finish. Marked "One of One Thousand", they sold for a then-pricey $100 (equivalent in purchasing power to about $3,000 USD, 2026). A popular 1950 Western starring James Stewart, Winchester '73, was based on the coveted gun. WCF .44-40 rounds are prominently featured throughout the movie, notably when it is the only cartridge passed out in a shooting contest offering a "One of One Thousand" as a prize, and after an Indian attack where female lead Shelley Winters requests the last round from a revolver loaned to her by male lead Jimmy Stewart, saved to use on herself if necessary, as a souvenir of surviving the bloodshed. The superior power of the 40-grain .44 caliber WCF round is also repeatedly touted over the rival Henry 1860 repeating rifle's 28-grain.44 caliber Henry rimfire load.

Also reinforced in the film - by all the main characters carrying only WCF .44 ammunition in their gunbelts - is the common chambering of both the Winchester 1873 and the single-action Colt "Peacemaker" six-shot revolver, another weapon that "Won the West", also chambered for .45 Colt loads.

In the television series The Rifleman, actor Chuck Connors' character Lucas McCain uses a modified Winchester Model 1892 rifle, an anachronism in the 1880s setting of the series, chambered in .44-40 throughout the series. In the TV Series Little House on the Prairie, Season 2 Episode 12, Mr. Edwards buys his son a Winchester Model 1894 chambered in .44-40, although this was an anachronism as this rifle was not manufactured chambered for the .44-40 cartridge at the time-frame depicted in the show.

== See also ==
- List of rimmed cartridges
- List of handgun cartridges
- List of rifle cartridges
- Table of handgun and rifle cartridges

== Bibliography ==
- Hatcher, Julian (1957). Hatcher's Notebook: A Standard Reference Book for Shooters, Gunsmiths, Ballisticians, Historians, Hunters, and Collectors (2nd ed.). p. 436. OCLC 2397069.
