= Ruger PC carbine =

Semi-automatic rifle

Ruger pistol carbine
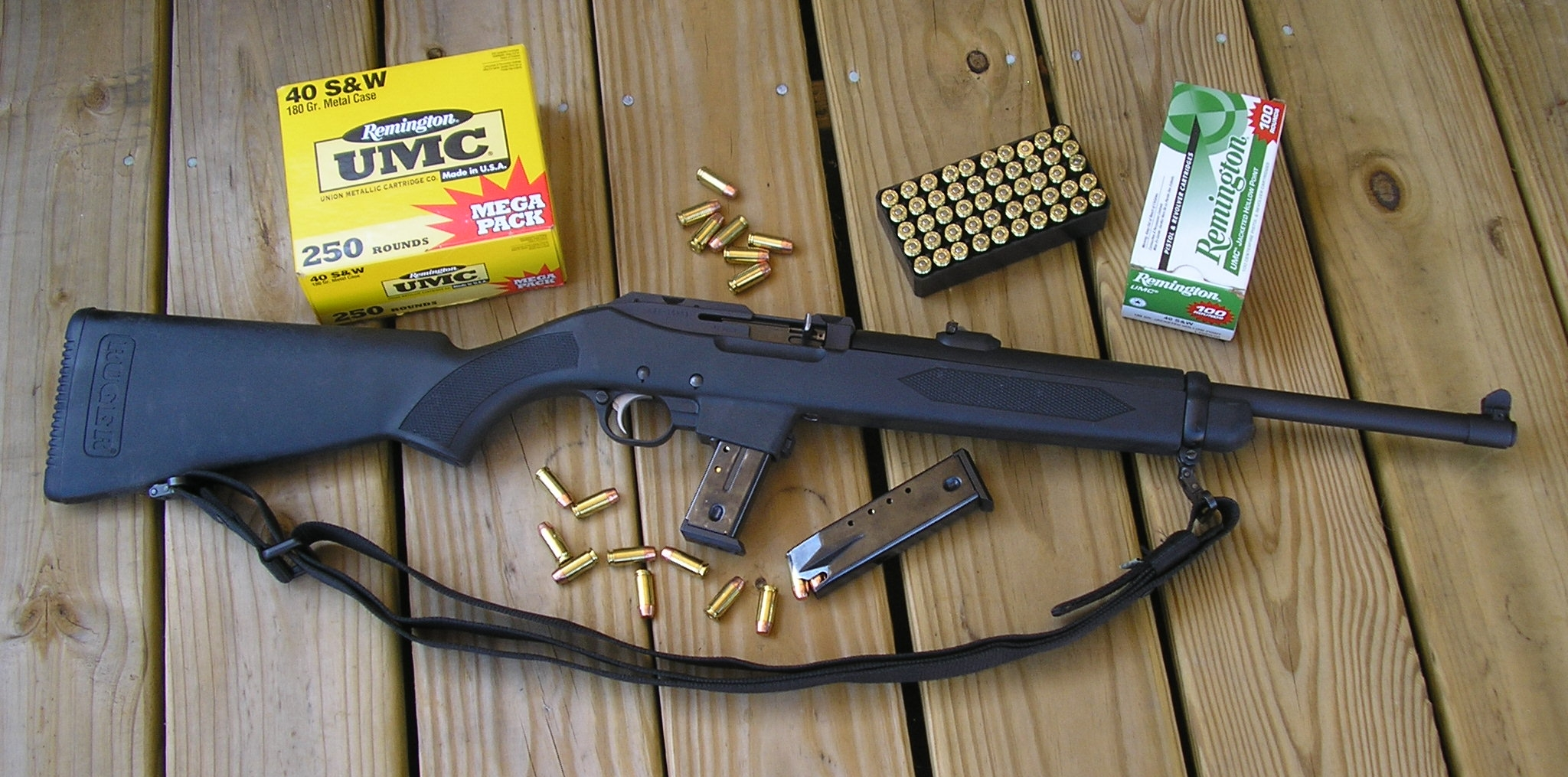
- Ruger PC4
- Type: Carbine
- Place of origin: United States

Production history
- Designer: Ruger
- Designed: 1996
- Manufacturer: Sturm, Ruger & Co.
- Produced: 1996-2006, 2017-present (Takedown variant)
- Variants: PC9, PC4

Specifications
- Mass: 7 lb (3.2 kg)
- Length: 34 in (860 mm)
- Barrel length: 16.24 in (412 mm)
- Cartridge: 9×19mm, .40 S&W
- Action: Blowback
- Feed system: 10, or 15 round P series box magazine
- Sights: Ghost ring rear, Blade front

Ruger PC carbine
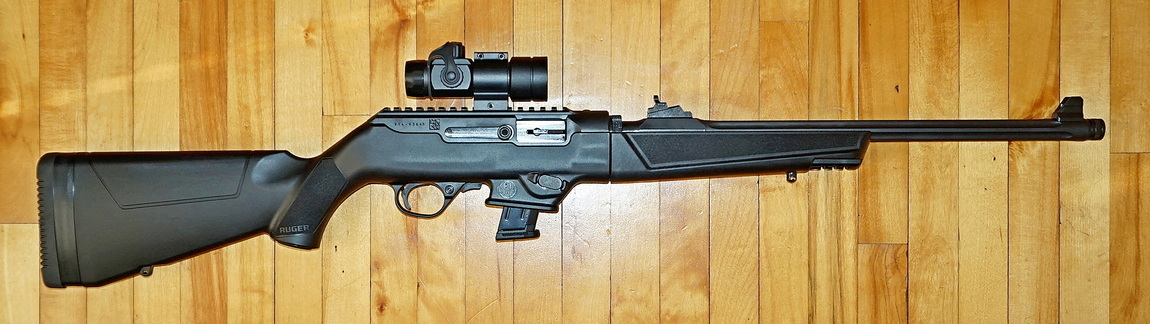
- Ruger PC carbine with Tasco red dot sight (Canadian version 18.6 in barrel with 10 round Ruger SR9 box magazine)
- Type: Carbine
- Place of origin: United States

Production history
- Designer: Ruger
- Designed: 2017
- Manufacturer: Sturm, Ruger & Co.
- Unit cost: $650
- Produced: 2017–present

Specifications
- Mass: 7 lb (3.2 kg)
- Length: 34.37 in (873 mm)
- Barrel length: 16.2 in (410 mm)
- Cartridge: 9×19mm
- Action: Blowback
- Feed system: 10, 17, 33, or 50 (drum) round Glock or Ruger SR9 box magazines (Magwell is interchangeable.)
- Sights: Protected Blade / Adjustable Ghost Ring

The Ruger Pistol-Caliber (PC) carbine is a blowback centerfire semi-automatic pistol-caliber carbine manufactured by Sturm, Ruger & Co., designed as a companion to certain Ruger P series semi-automatic pistols, using the same 9 mm Parabellum and .40 S&W caliber cartridges and magazines of the P-Series pistols.

== History ==
The carbine was manufactured in 1996. The Maryland State Police adopted the PC carbine.

In 2007, Ruger discontinued production of their original police carbine, citing low demand. More than ten years later on 29 December 2017, Ruger announced the reintroduction of a new upgraded 9 mm takedown model called the Ruger PC carbine with the PC now referencing the old police carbine name and the product descriptions calling them pistol-caliber carbines, which has a 16.12-inch (409 mm) threaded barrel and accepts not only the Ruger SR9 pistol magazine, but also magazines from Glock, Ruger American Pistol and the new Ruger Security-9 pistols via interchangeable magazine well adaptor inserts.

In early 2019, Ruger introduced a variant PC carbine model with free-floating M-LOK handguard, and also reintroduced the .40 S&W caliber.

In October 2026, Ruger announced the discontinuation of the PC carbine, along with several other firearms to focus on models like the RXM and Security-9 handguns, and Mini-14 and 10/22 rifles.

== Design ==
The carbine has some unique design features. The action is a simple blowback design, which requires a fairly massive bolt to handle the pressure of 9mm and .40 S&W. To prevent the gun from being too unbalanced by the large bolt, the bolt consists of two parts; the main body of the bolt is fairly light and located in the receiver, while the other part is just a weight located under the forend of the carbine. These two parts are held together by strong, rigid steel bars. The combined mass serves to hold the breech safely closed during firing, while keeping the center of gravity forward, so the gun handles well.

Another unique feature is the bolt lock. Since blowback guns of these calibers require heavy bolts, the inertia of dropping the gun can cause the bolt to come partially open, rendering the gun unfireable until the bolt is manually closed all the way. To prevent this, the carbine uses a bolt lock that locks the bolt securely closed so that a fall will not dislodge it. A slight pressure on the trigger or on the bolt handle, however, will disengage the bolt lock so that the bolt can move for firing or clearing the action.

In addition to caliber, the carbine also comes with a choice in iron sights. The standard model uses notch-and-post sights, while the GR models are equipped with ghost ring rear sights. The ghost ring sights cost more, but they are generally considered better for defensive purposes, as they allow faster sight alignment under poor lighting conditions plus a longer sight radius for greater accuracy. The carbine also has Ruger-style scope bases built into the receiver, allowing optical sights to be easily and securely mounted.

Both the PC9 (the 9 mm version) and the PC4 (.40 S&W version) are modelled after Ruger's highly successful Ruger 10/22 rimfire carbine. It is intended as a shoulder-braced weapon for law enforcement use, although it was available for sale to civilians as well. The intent is that an officer will carry a Ruger P-series pistol as a sidearm, and keep a police carbine available (for example, in the patrol vehicle) as a more offensive weapon if needed.

Since the PC-9 has a 16-inch (410 mm) barrel, it provides more muzzle energy with the same ammunition used by pistols which often only have 4-inch (100 mm) barrels (see internal ballistics), thus better stopping power, accuracy and effective range than pistols.

A .45 ACP version was developed, but it was not produced.

== See also ==
- Ruger PC Charger, a pistol made from the PC Carbine's chassis.
