= Ruger American =

Ruger American may refer to any of the following products produced by Sturm, Ruger & Co.:

- Ruger American Pistol, a line of polymer-framed centerfire pistols
- Ruger American Rifle, a line of centerfire bolt-action rifles
- Ruger American Rimfire, a rimfire variant of the Ruger American Rifle
