= Ruger PC Charger =

- Type: Semi-automatic pistol
- Place of origin: United States

Production history
- Designer: Ruger
- Designed: 2017
- Manufacturer: Sturm, Ruger & Co.
- Unit cost: US$899.00 (MSRP)
- Produced: 2020–present

Specifications
- Mass: 5.2 lb (2.4 kg)
- Length: 16.50 in (419 mm)
- Barrel length: 6.5 in (170 mm)
- Cartridge: 9×19mm
- Action: Blowback
- Feed system: 10, 17, 33, or 50 (drum) round Glock or Ruger SR9 box magazines (Magwell is interchangeable.)
- Sights: Protected Blade / Adjustable Ghost Ring

The Ruger PC Charger is a blowback centerfire semi-automatic pistol manufactured by Sturm, Ruger & Co.

== PC Charger ==
In 2020, following the success of Ruger's PC Carbine, Ruger announced the PC Charger - a 9mm pistol based on the Ruger PC Carbine's chassis. The PC Charger is compatible with AR-style pistol grips, and featured M-LOK compatible slots for mounting compatible accessories.

The PC Charger maintains the interchangeable magazine well system in order for the weapon to accept both Ruger Security-9 and Ruger SR9 magazines as well as Glock magazines. The Charger also uses the same action as the PC Carbine - a dead blow action. The magazine release and charging handle are reversible to accommodate right or left handed use. The pistol ships with a 17-round magazine, though a 10-round state compliant model is also available.

The PC Charger shares components with the popular Ruger 10/22 rifle, and features a trigger with a four-pound pull weight. The Charger is designed to accept many accessories, including a brace, that make it easier to use and more accurate than a traditional handheld pistol.

While the PC Charger does not look like an orthodox pistol, it was designed to meet the legal status of one in the United States, as defined by the ATF. This might allow the PC Charger to be carried or used in ways that other firearms might be restricted from, though local US State laws often vary.
