= Ruger Wrangler =

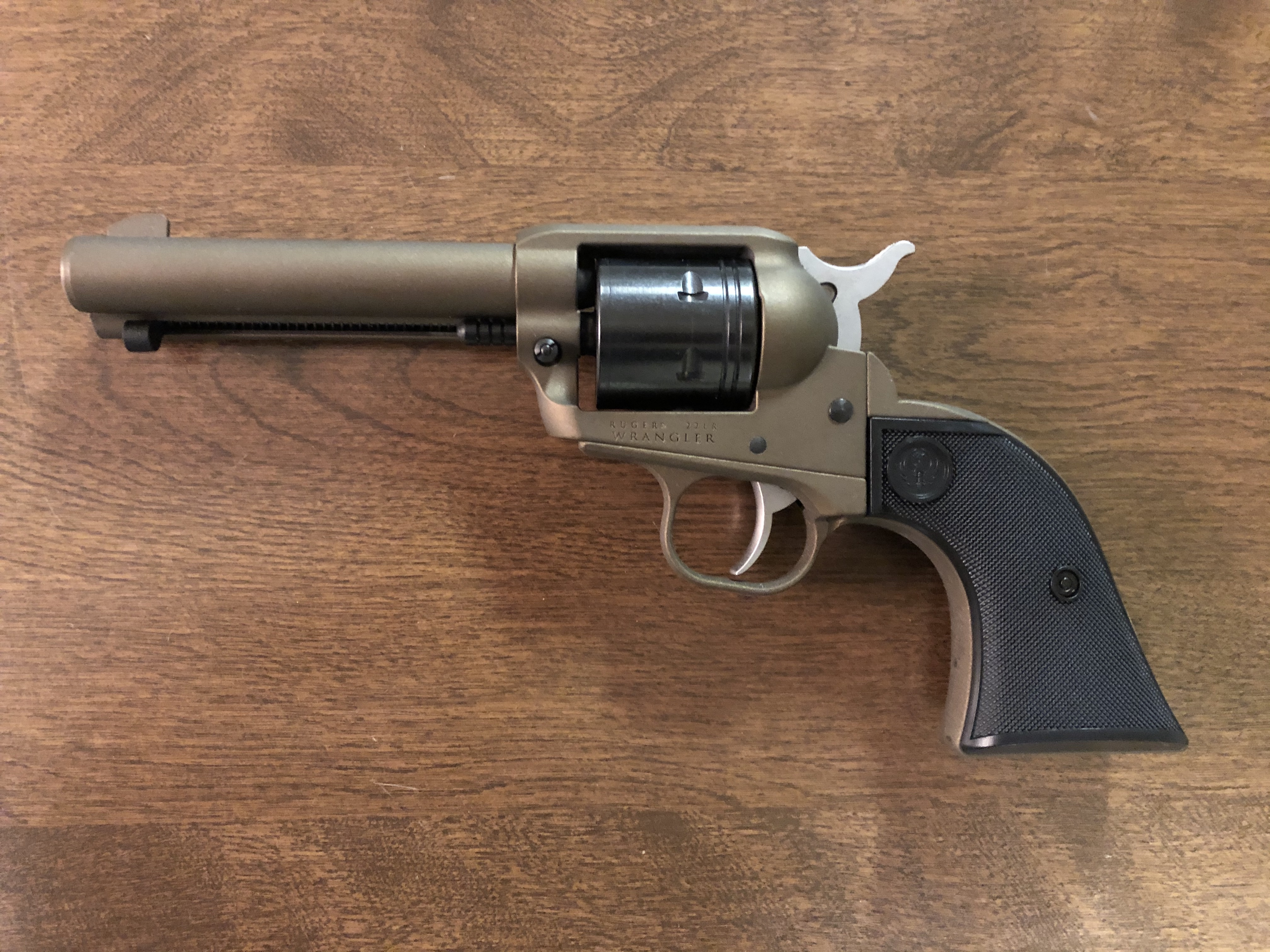
- A Wrangler with Burnt Bronze Cerakote finish
- Type: Revolver
- Place of origin: United States

Production history
- Designer: Ruger
- Designed: 2019
- Manufacturer: Ruger
- Unit cost: $269-279 (MSRP)
- Produced: 2019–present
- Variants: Super Wrangler

Specifications
- Mass: 28–34.1 oz (790–970 g)
- Length: 8.62–13 in (219–330 mm)
- Barrel length: 3.75–7.5 in (95–191 mm)
- Cartridge: .22 Long Rifle
- Action: Single-action revolver
- Feed system: 6-round cylinder
- Sights: Iron sights

The Ruger Wrangler is a single-action rimfire revolver produced by Sturm, Ruger & Co. Chambered for .22 Long Rifle cartridges, it was announced in April 2019. The revolver makes extensive use of aluminum and zinc castings for ease of manufacturability, and also has an unfluted cylinder and uses metal injection molded components for further cost reduction. The Wrangler's price point has been described as "very attractive", and is less than half the MSRP of Ruger's Single-Six and Bearcat models.

== Specifications ==
The Wrangler is chambered in .22 Long Rifle and has a capacity of 6 rounds. Barrel lengths include 3.75", 4.62", 6.50", and 7.50". The 3.75" barrel also has a birdshead grip option available. The three most available color options are black, silver, and bronze Cerakote, but other color options exist as distributor exclusives. Most models come with black plastic grips, but some models come with wooden grips and aftermarket grips are readily available.

The sights are simple and nonadjustable, and are set at 15 yards. The front sight is a blade sight and the rear is an integral sight. The Wrangler also has a transfer bar safety which makes it safe to keep all chambers loaded with the hammer resting on a loaded chamber.

== Operation ==
Unlike the Ruger Single Six and other single action revolvers, the Wrangler's hammer only has two positions: “cocked” and “all the way forward” as opposed to the traditional four hammer positions: “cocked,” “loading,” “safety,” and “all the way forward." When the hammer is all the way forward and the loading gate is open, the cylinder is unlatched and spins freely. It does not click each time a chamber makes a pass like other single action revolvers.

To remove the cylinder, the user must open the loading gate, hold down the base pin latch, then pull out the base pin assembly. The cylinder can then be removed from the loading gate side of the revolver.

Although the instruction manual states the Wrangler can be dry fired without damage to any of components, some have reported issues, claiming dry firing the Wrangler can peen the cylinder bores and prevent rounds from being loaded or fully seated in the chambers.

== Variants ==
=== Super Wrangler ===
The Super Wrangler is an upgraded version of the Wrangler and has an MSRP of $329. It was announced in April 2023. It is constructed of alloy steel. It has a barrel length of 5.50", an overall length of 11", and weighs 37.7 oz. The front sight is a ramp sight and the rear sight is adjustable for windage and elevation. An additional .22 WMR cylinder is included with the gun, but is not compatible with the Wrangler and Single Six.

=== Table of Wrangler variants ===
All variants have a twist rate of 1:14" RH, and 6 grooves.

Wrangler Variants
Model #	Barrel Length	Overall Length	Weight	Color	Grip Style	Distributor Exclusive
2002	4.62"	10.25"	30 oz	Black Cerakote	Checkered Synthetic	No
2003	4.62"	10.25"	30 oz	Silver Cerakote	Checkered Synthetic	No
2004	4.62"	10.25"	30 oz	Burnt Bronze Cerakote	Checkered Synthetic	No
2008	4.62"	10.25"	30 oz	OD Green	Checkered Synthetic	RSR Group
2014	4.62"	10.25"	30 oz	Cobalt Cerakote	Hardwood	Talo Distributors Inc. Comes with a DeSantis Wild Hog Field and Range Holster.
2015	3.75"	8.62"	28 oz	Black Cerakote	Birdshead Synthetic	No
2016	3.75"	8.62"	28 oz	Silver Cerakote	Birdshead Synthetic	No
2017	3.75"	8.62"	28 oz	Burnt Bronze Cerakote	Birdshead Synthetic	No
2021	4.62"	10.25"	30 oz	Plum Brown Cerakote	Checkered Synthetic	Davidson's Inc
2022	4.62"	10.25"	30 oz	Stone Gray Cerakote	Checkered Synthetic	Sports South, LLC
2023	4.62"	10.25"	30 oz	Tungsten Cerakote	Checkered Synthetic	Lipsey's
2024	4.62"	10.25"	30 oz	Midnight Bronze Cerakote	Checkered Synthetic	Lipsey's
2025	4.62"	10.25"	30 oz	Crushed Orchid Cerakote	Checkered Synthetic	Bill Hicks & Co., Ltd.
2026	4.62"	10.25"	30 oz	Davidsons Dark Earth Cerakote	Checkered Synthetic	Davidson's Inc
2027	4.62"	10.25"	30 oz	Black Cherry Cerakote	Checkered Synthetic	Big Rock Sports
2030	3.75"	8.62"	28 oz	Cobalt Cerakote	Birdshead Hardwood	Talo Distributors Inc. Comes with a DeSantis Wild Hog Field and Range Holster.
2037	6.50"	12"	32.1 oz	Silver Cerakote	Checkered Synthetic	No
2038	6.50"	12"	32.1 oz	Burnt Bronze Cerakote	Checkered Synthetic	No
2039	7.50"	13"	34.1 oz	Silver Cerakote	Checkered Synthetic	No
2040	7.50"	13"	34.1 oz	Burnt Bronze Cerakote	Checkered Synthetic	No
2041	3.75"	8.62"	28 oz	Black Cherry Cerakote	Birdshead Synthetic	Big Rock Sports
2042	6.50"	12"	32.1 oz	Black Cerakote	Checkered Synthetic	No
2043	7.50"	13"	34.1 oz	Black Cerakote	Checkered Synthetic	No
2052	3.75"	9.30"	26.1 oz	Black Cerakote	Checkered Synthetic	No
2053	3.75"	9.30"	26.1 oz	Silver Cerakote	Checkered Synthetic	No
2054	3.75"	9.30"	26.1 oz	Burnt Bronze Cerakote	Checkered Synthetic	No
2057	6.50"	12"	32.1 oz	Cobalt Cerakote	Hardwood	Talo Distributors Inc. Comes with a DeSantis Wild Hog Field and Range Holster.
2058	7.50"	13"	34.1 oz	Cobalt Cerakote	Hardwood	Talo Distributors Inc. Comes with a DeSantis Wild Hog Field and Range Holster.

=== Table of Super Wrangler Variants ===
All variants have a twist rate of 1:14" RH, and 6 grooves.

Super Wrangler Variants
Model #	Barrel Length	Overall Length	Weight	Color	Grip Style	Distributor Exclusive
2032	5.50"	11"	37.7 oz	Black Cerakote	Checkered Synthetic	No
2033	5.50"	11"	37.7 oz	Silver Cerakote	Checkered Synthetic	No
2034	5.50"	11"	37.7 oz	Bronze Cerakote	Checkered Synthetic	No

== Legality ==
The Wrangler is banned from sale in Minnesota due to the construction of the frame and grip. The frame is made from A380 aluminum alloy and the grip is made from cast zinc which lets the gun have a lower price point, but conflicts with Minnesota's statues 624.712.

Subd. 4.Saturday night special pistol.

"Saturday night special pistol" means a pistol other than an antique firearm or a pistol for which the propelling force is carbon dioxide, air or other vapor, or children's pop guns or toys, having a frame, barrel, cylinder, slide or breechblock:

(1) of any material having a melting point (liquidus) of less than 1,000 degrees Fahrenheit, or

(2) of any material having an ultimate tensile strength of less than 55,000 pounds per square inch, or

(3) of any powdered metal having a density of less than 7.5 grams per cubic centimeter.

Since A380 aluminum alloy has an ultimate tensile strength of 310 MPa (45000 psi), and zinc has a melting point of 692.68 K (419.53 °C, 787.15 °F), the Wrangler violates the first and second points of the statue and makes it a "Saturday night special pistol". Minnesota's statues 624.716 makes it a misdemeanor for a federally licensed arms dealer to sell a "Saturday night special pistol" or for anyone to build whole or part of one.

624.716 SATURDAY NIGHT SPECIALS PROHIBITED; PENALTY. Any federally licensed firearms dealer who sells a Saturday night special pistol, or any person who manufactures or assembles a Saturday night special pistol in whole or in part, shall be guilty of a gross misdemeanor.
