= Ruger Single-Six =

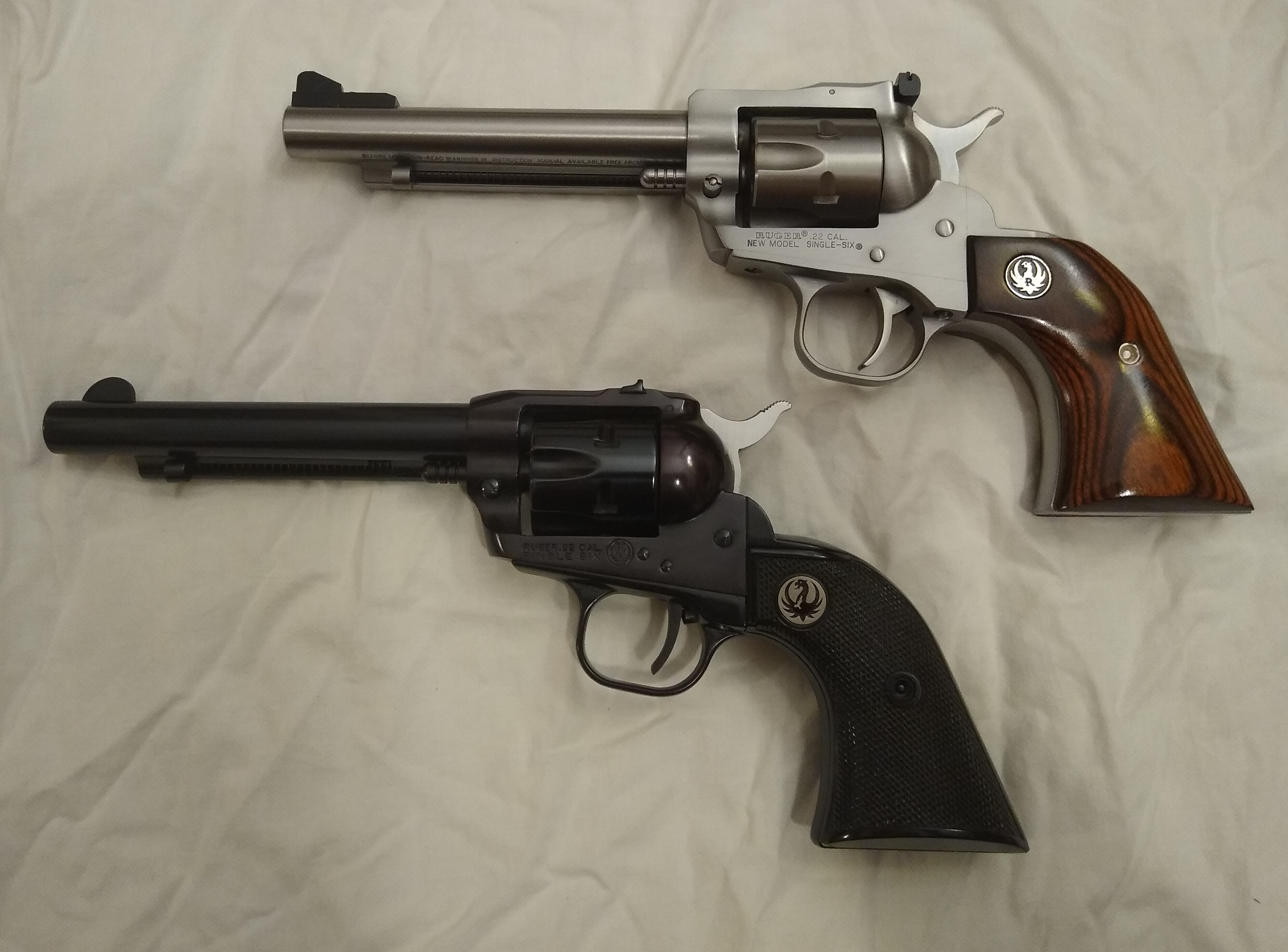
- Ruger New Model Single-Six (stainless) on top and Ruger "Old Model" Single-Six (blued) on bottom.
- Type: Single action
- Place of origin: United States

Production history
- Designer: Sturm, Ruger
- Designed: 1953 (Old Model); 1973 (New Model)
- Manufacturer: Sturm, Ruger & Co.
- Unit cost: $534-754 (MSRP)
- Produced: 1953–1973 (Old Model); 1973–present (New Model)
- No. built: Over 700,000 (Old Model); Over 1,057,000 (New Model, as of 1993)
- Variants: Old Model, New Model

Specifications
- Mass: 32–40 oz (910–1,130 g)
- Length: 10.25–15 in (260–381 mm)
- Barrel length: 4.625 in (117.5 mm); 5.5 in (140 mm); 6.5 in (170 mm); 9.5 in (240 mm)
- Cartridge: .22 LR, .22 WMR, .17 HMR, .32 H&R Magnum
- Barrels: 6-groove
- Action: Single-action revolver
- Feed system: 6-round cylinder
- Sights: Fixed or adjustable iron sights (the Hunter model has provisions for mounting a scope)

The Ruger Single-Six is a single-action rimfire revolver produced by Sturm, Ruger & Co. The Single-Six was first released in June 1953.

The Single-Six is currently produced as the New Model Single-Six. The term "New Model" simply means that this model includes Ruger's transfer bar mechanism for increased safety, allowing one to carry the revolver safely with all six chambers loaded. Prior to 1973, the Single-Six was produced without the transfer bar mechanism, making it less safe to carry with all six chambers loaded, and with the hammer resting on a loaded chamber. The transfer bar safety allows the revolver to fire only when the trigger has been pulled. Ruger provides the transfer bar safety upgrade free of charge for owners of any old model Single-Six, though this may come with a significant trigger-feel penalty.

== Specifications ==
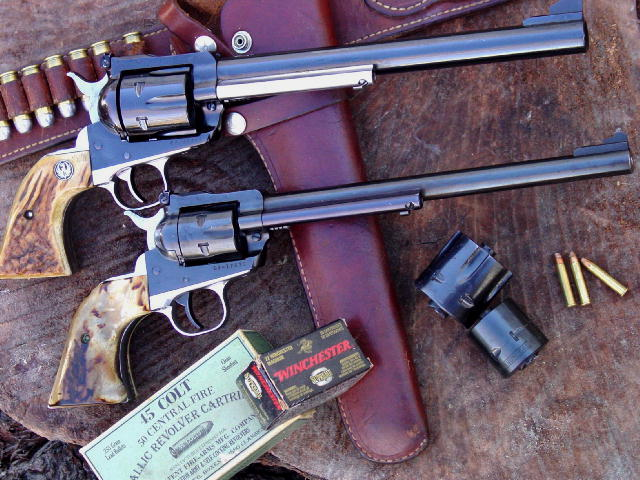
Custom Long Barrel 45 Colt/45 ACP Blackhawk over Standard Ruger Single-Six 9.5 inch barrel

The New Model Single-Six is currently chambered in .22 LR, .22 WMR (.22 Magnum), and .17 HMR (initially offered with a second cylinder in .17 HM2). Barrel lengths include 4 5/8 in (120 mm), 5 1/2 in (140 mm), 6 1/2 in (170 mm), 7 1/2 in (190 mm), and 9 1/2 in (240 mm), available in both blued and stainless steel.

Ruger manufactures several "convertible" models that ship with both a .22 LR cylinder and .22 WMR cylinder, allowing the use of both cartridges. The .22 Short and .22 Long cartridges can also be fired in the Long Rifle cylinder. For those models that ship with both cylinders, the last 3 digits of the serial number are engraved on the front of the cylinder; only cylinders that have been properly timed should be used with any given revolver. The term Super Single-Six refers to those models which have fully adjustable target sights.

In 2011 Ruger introduced the Single-Ten and in 2012 they introduced the Single-Nine. Both of these revolvers are stainless steel variants of the Single-Six design with fiber optic sights. The Single-Ten is chambered in .22 Long Rifle, with ten chambers and a 5.5 inch barrel, whereas the Single-Nine is chambered in .22 Winchester Magnum Rimfire (.22 WMR), with nine chambers and a barrel length of 6.5 inches (170 mm).

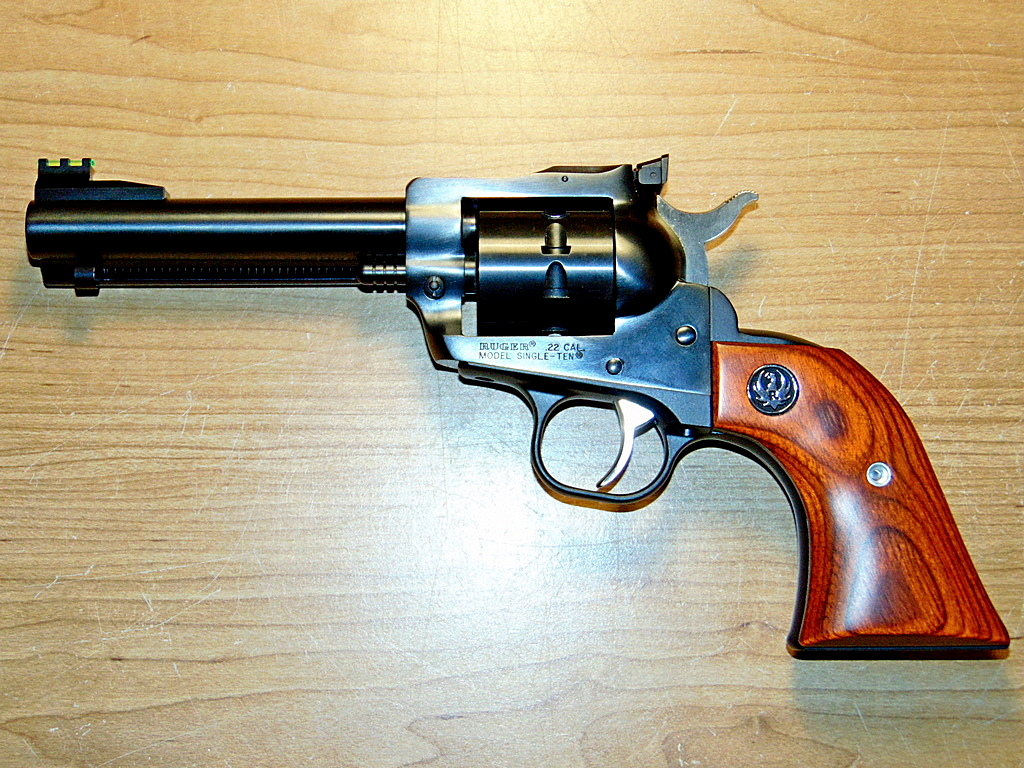
Ruger Single-Ten 4.62 inch barrel

=== .32 centerfire models ===
From 1984 to 1997 Ruger chambered the New Model Single-Six in .32 H&R Magnum (which allows the use of .32 S&W and .32 S&W Long cartridges). Ruger reintroduced this caliber option in 2002, and in September 2014 released the Single-Seven in .327 Federal Magnum as well, in a seven-shot stainless steel variant, with barrel lengths of 4.62 inches (117 mm), 5.5 inches (140 mm), and 7.5 inches (190 mm).

== See also ==
- List of firearms
- List of handgun cartridges
- Ruger Bearcat
- Ruger Wrangler
- Bisley grip variant
