= LC9 =

LC9, LC-9, or LC/9 may refer to:

- LC9, a rocket launch pad at the Andøya Rocket Range, Norway
- Buick V6 LC9, an engine made by General Motors from 1978 to 1979
- Cape Canaveral Air Force Station Launch Complex 9, a rocket launch pad in Florida
- LC9 (band), a South Korean boy group
- Ruger LC9, a semi-automatic pistol
- LC9 Vortec 5300, a small-block engine made by General Motors
