= Alexander McCormick Sturm =

American businessman

- William Batterman Ruger and Sturm (with beard) in 1950. Together they founded Sturm, Ruger & Co., with Ruger providing the gun expertise, and Sturm providing the eagle logo and financial backing
- Born: June 23, 1923; Westport, Connecticut, U.S.
- Died: November 16, 1951 (aged 28); Norwalk, Connecticut, U.S.
- Education: Yale University
- Occupations: artist, author, entrepreneur
- Employer: Sturm, Ruger & Co.
- Spouse(s): Paulina Longworth (m. 1944–1951; his death)
- Children: Joanna Sturm
- Parent(s): Justin Sturm; Katherine McCormick

Alexander McCormick Sturm (June 23, 1923 – November 16, 1951) was an American artist, author, and entrepreneur who co-founded in 1949 the American firearms maker Sturm, Ruger & Co. Sturm provided the start-up money and designed the Germanic heraldic eagle found on all Ruger guns. Sturm came from a prominent Connecticut family, and his wealthy mother was of the McCormick mercantile family. He was a Yale University graduate. Not long after the company had begun to succeed financially and gain traction, Sturm died from viral hepatitis.

== Early life and education ==
Sturm was born in Westport, Connecticut, to sculptor, author and Yale football star Justin Sturm and Katherine "Kit" McCormick. He had one younger brother, Justin Jr., known as "Dusty". Kit's brother Alexander Agnew McCormick Jr. was a World War I officer and pilot. As a writer and artist, he was known for his two illustrated children's books—The Problem Fox, and From Ambush to Zig-zag—both published before he graduated from Yale; and for his lavish playboy lifestyle. A reviewer for The New York Times described The Problem Fox as "marvelous", and "a little masterpiece."

While a student at Yale, Sturm liked to dine at the best hotel in town, while other students would eat at the school dining hall. One of his classmates from his undergraduate days at Yale recalled:

He would go to New York regularly on the weekends. His clothes were all custom-tailored, and he was a Renaissance type, with all kinds of talent. An artistic sense, a true brilliance, were in his genes. Alex was a voracious collector: guns, canes, swords, heraldry.

Although Sturm preferred to stay indoors, he was an accomplished polo player.

== Co-founds Sturm, Ruger & Co. ==
He is perhaps best known today for his $50,000 seed-money investment in co-founding Sturm, Ruger & Co. in 1949 prompted by his interest in guns and his friendship with William Batterman Ruger. Ruger provided the technical know-how as a gunsmith, and business acumen; Sturm provided the Germanic heraldic-based red eagle logo and all of the financial backing necessary for starting the fledgling firearms business.

Ruger once stated,

I remember Sturm and I going to New York. We invited Warren Page of Field & Stream magazine to join us for lunch so we could tell him about the pistol. Page was looking forward to meeting Alex; he expected an impressive person, which Alex was, but not in the way Page expected him to be. Alex was an odd fish in those days. He had a beard, wore green suits with all sorts of bells and whistles on them — cuffed sleeves and so on — and he had a marvelous manner. He gave you the general impression of being a prewar German baronial type. He was actually a very artistic and sensitive person, but he also looked like a bull in the woods and was quite strong.

== Marriage ==
During World War II, Sturm was an officer with the Office of Strategic Services in Washington D.C. While in D.C., he met Paulina Longworth, the daughter of Alice Roosevelt Longworth.

Sturm and Longworth married in 1944, with his brother Dusty serving as best man. They had one daughter, Joanna Mercedes Alessandra Sturm, born in 1946. Longworth had helped launch Sturm, Ruger & Co., stuffing envelopes with Sturm on Sunday afternoons, and giving moral support to the two partners. The couple lived in Sturm's home in Westport, which was situated near his parents' house on property the family owned.

== Death ==
Sturm became seriously ill in 1951 with viral hepatitis and died after a ten-day stay in the hospital. He was 28 years old. The Sturm, Ruger trademark, which had been a red eagle, was changed to a black eagle by his friend Bill Ruger to mourn the death of his business partner.

Sturm's wife died in January 1957, at the age of 31, from an overdose of sleeping pills. Their daughter was raised by Paulina's mother, Alice Roosevelt Longworth.
