= Ruger Security-9 =

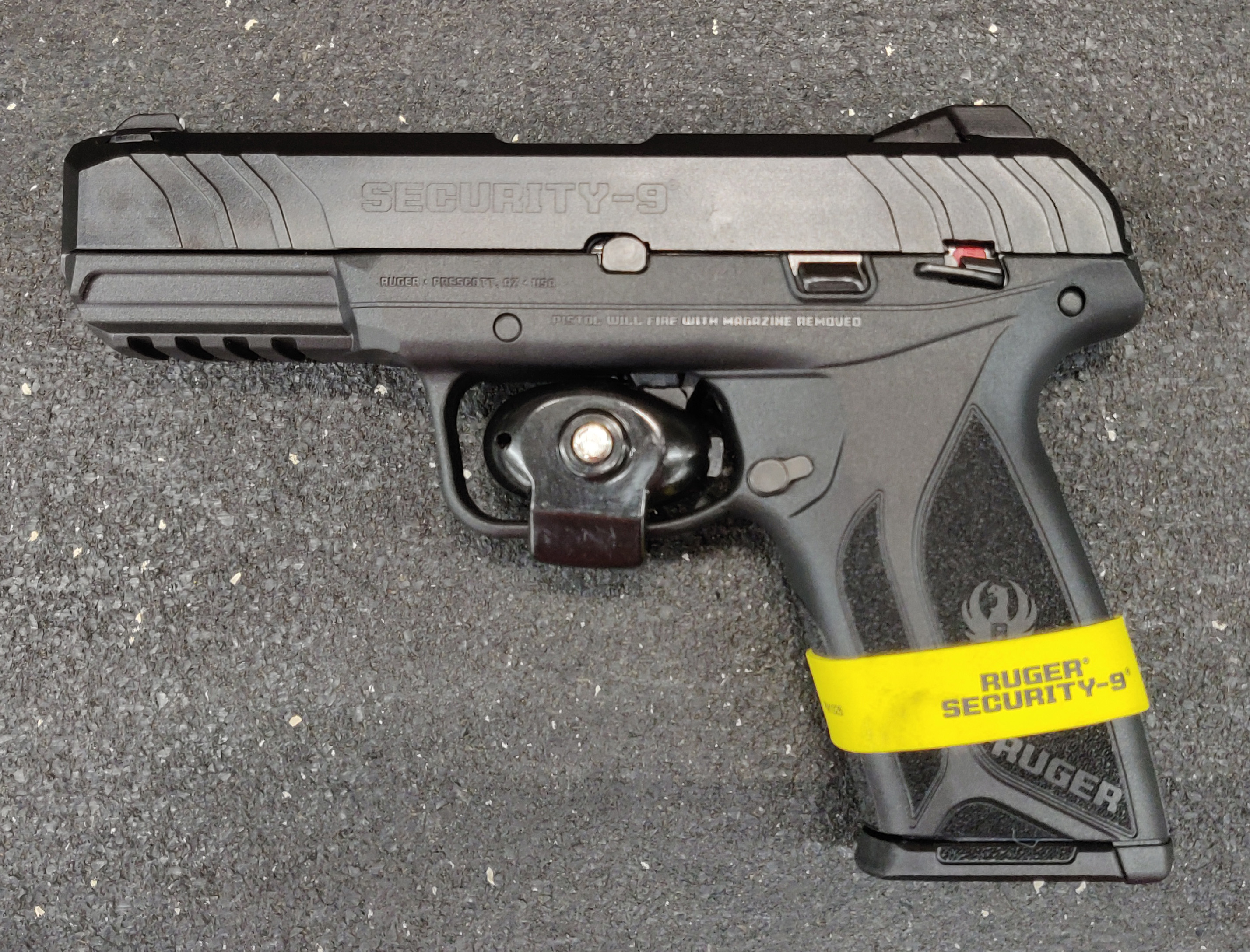
- Type: Pistol
- Place of origin: United States

Production history
- Designed: 2017
- Manufacturer: Ruger
- Produced: 2017–present
- Variants: Security-9; Security-9 Compact; Security-9 Pro

Specifications
- Mass: 23.7 oz (670 g)
- Length: 7.24 in (184 mm)
- Barrel length: 4.0 in (100 mm)
- Width: 1.02 in (26 mm)
- Height: 5.0 in (130 mm)
- Cartridge: 9×19mm
- Feed system: 15, 17, or 10-round box magazine
- Sights: Adjustable iron sights

The Ruger Security-9 is a 9mm caliber semi-automatic pistol announced by Sturm, Ruger & Co. on November 22, 2017.

== History ==
Introduced in late 2017, Ruger intended to use the Security-9 to replace the Ruger SR-Series. The Security-9 managed to be even less expensive than the SR-Series as it eliminated the adjustable backstrap and ambidextrous magazine release, used an internal hammer-fired mechanism instead of a striker-fired mechanism and hardened aluminum alloy rails instead of steel rails. The Security-9 was primarily aimed at the affordable handgun demographic.

== Design ==
The design and internal hammer action of the Security-9 pistol are derived from firearms first produced by Kel-Tec (such as the P11) circa 1995.

The trigger on the Security-9, despite its hybrid single- and double-action nature, is relatively light. Ruger calls this mechanism the "Secure Action" design, and it combines the trigger pull of the LCP with single-action, as it has a positive reset. It also has a hammer that provides a strong ignition force that has a slide racking to make it much easier to slide. The pistol also features a sight system with drift adjustable rear sight and a fixed front sight. The strong spring tension and a hammer catch help prevent the hammer from contacting the firing pin unless the trigger is pulled. A horizontal pin must be pushed out of the frame in order to separate the slide from the frame. The trigger does not need to be pulled prior to disassembly.

The Ruger Security-9, like the Ruger American Pistol and the SR-Series, has a polymer frame made out of glass-filled nylon. The Security-9 comes with 15 round magazines and will function with SR-Series magazines. (Ruger also offers 17-round magazines.) Security-9 magazines will also function in the Ruger SR9c. The Ruger Security-9 does not have the ambidextrous mechanisms of the SR-Series. However, it has features that the full-sized SR9 did not, including front cocking serrations and a standard Picatinny rail for accessories.

== Variants ==
When they were first introduced in 2017, the Security-9 model was offered with 15 or 10 round magazines, and certain models came from the factory with a Viridian E-Series Red Laser on the accessory rail. The pistol is also available with a pre-installed Hogue wraparound rubber grip.

In 2019, Ruger introduced the Security-9 Compact. Designed for concealed carry, the Compact model features a shorter slide, shorter barrel, and overall smaller frame. The Compact takes 10-round magazines.

Also in 2019, Ruger introduced the Security-9 Pro series. The Pro models are a higher-end version of the standard Security-9 and Security-9 Compact, but feature factory-installed steel tritium night sights and no manual thumb safety.

Ruger also offers the Security-9 in different colors: Davidson's Flat Dark Earth, Black, TALO Turquoise, Sports South Silver, RSR Group Cobalt, Big Rock Sports Coyote Brown, Davidson's Battleworn Flag, Lipsey's Flat Dark Earth Frame(Black slide).
