= Ruger LC carbine =

Semi-automatic carbine

- Type: Carbine
- Place of origin: United States

Production history
- Designer: Ruger
- Manufacturer: Sturm, Ruger & Co.
- Unit cost: US$1,099.00 (MSRP)
- Produced: 2022–present

Specifications
- Mass: 5.9 lb (2.7 kg)
- Length: 30.60 in (777 mm)
- Barrel length: 16.25 in (413 mm)
- Cartridge: 5.7x28mm, .45 ACP, 10mm Auto
- Action: Blowback
- Feed system: 10, 17, 33, or 50 (drum) round Glock or Ruger-5.7 box magazines
- Sights: Adjustable Rapid Deploy

The Ruger Light Compact (LC) carbine is a blowback centerfire semi-automatic pistol-caliber carbine manufactured by Sturm, Ruger & Co., designed as a companion to certain Glock or Ruger-5.7 magazines.

== See also ==
- Kel-Tec SUB-2000
- Kel-Tec P50
