= Ruger Precision Rifle =

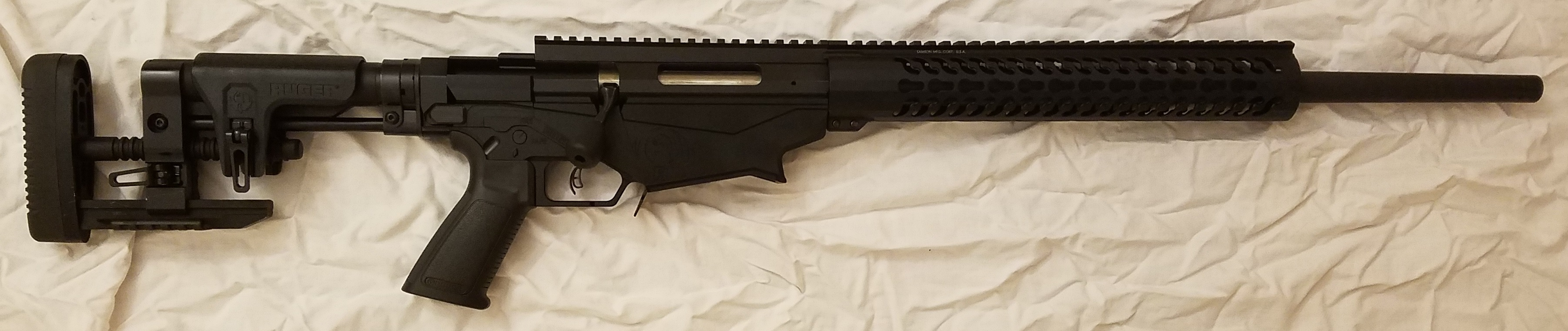
- Ruger Precision Rifle, .308 Winchester, 1st generation
- Type: Bolt-action rifle
- Place of origin: United States

Service history
- Wars: Myanmar civil war (2021–present); Russo-Ukrainian War

Production history
- Manufacturer: Sturm, Ruger & Co.
- Unit cost: US$1599–2099 MSRP
- Produced: 2015–present

Specifications
- Mass: .308 Win and 5.56/.223 Rem 9.8 lb (4.4 kg); 6mm Creedmoor 10.8 lb (4.9 kg); 6.5mm Creedmoor 10.7 lb (4.9 kg); 6.5mm PRC 11 lb (5.0 kg); .338 Lapua Magnum 15.2 lb (6.9 kg); .300 Win Mag 15.2 lb (6.9 kg); 6mm Creedmoor 10.8 lb (4.9 kg); .300 PRC 15.2 lb (6.9 kg)
- Length: .308 Win and 5.56/.223 Rem 31.60 in (80.3 cm) Folded Stock / 39.25–42.75 in (99.7–108.6 cm) Overall Length; 6mm Creedmoor and 6.5mm Creedmoor 35.60 in (90.4 cm) Folded Stock / 43.25–46.75 in (109.9–118.7 cm) Overall Length; 6.5 PRC 35.6 in (90 cm) Folded Stock / 45.25–48.75 in (114.9–123.8 cm) Overall Length; .338 Lapua Magnum and .300 Win Mag and .300 PRC 40.35 in (102.5 cm) Folded Stock / 49–52.5 in (124–133 cm) Overall Length
- Cartridge: .243 Winchester; .308 Win; 5.56/.223 Rem; 6mm Creedmoor; 6.5mm Creedmoor; .338 Lapua Magnum; .300 Win Mag; .300 PRC
- Action: Bolt-action
- Effective firing range: 1600 yards
- Maximum firing range: ~2000 yards
- Feed system: 10-round detachable box magazine
- Sights: none

The Ruger Precision Rifle (RPR) is a bolt-action rifle introduced by Sturm, Ruger & Co. on 17 July 2015.

== Models ==
The RPR was originally announced in the following calibers and configurations:

- .308 Win. with 1:10 twist, 20 in (51 cm) barrel, weighing 9.7 lb (4.4 kg)
- 6.5 Creedmoor with a 1:8 twist, 24 in (61 cm) barrel, weighing 10.6 lb (4.8 kg)
- .243 Winchester with a 1:7.7 twist, 26 in (66 cm) barrel, weighing 11 lb (5.0 kg)

A newer Ruger Precision Rifle "Gen 2" was announced on 6 May 2016 with several enhancements over the original. The new version includes a new handguard, a hybrid muzzle brake (5/8-24 threaded), and a billet aluminum bolt shroud. The announced models were:

- .308 Win with 1:10 RH twist, 20 in (51 cm) barrel, weighing 9.8 lb (4.4 kg)
- 6mm Creedmoor with a 1:7.7 RH twist, 24 in (61 cm) barrel, weighing 10.8 lb (4.9 kg)
- 6.5mm Creedmoor with 1:8 RH twist, 24 in (61 cm) barrel, weighing 10.7 lb (4.9 kg)

A model chambered in 5.56×45mm NATO was announced on 27 March 2017. It has a 1:7 RH twist, 20 in (51 cm) barrel, weighing 9.8 lb (4.4 kg)

Models chambered in the magnum cartridges .338 Lapua Magnum, .300 Win Mag, and .300 PRC went on sale in 2018.

- .338 Lapua Magnum with 1:9.375 RH twist, 26 in (66 cm) barrel, weighing 15.2 lb (6.8 kg)
- .300 Winchester Magnum with 1:9 RH twist, 26 in (66 cm) barrel, weighing 15.2 lb (6.8 kg)
- .300 PRC with 1:9 RH twist, 26 in (66 cm) barrel, weighing 15.2 lb (6.8 kg)

== Technical features ==
The Ruger Precision Rifle has a proprietary Pre-Fit barrel system. Pre-chambered "Drop-In Ready" barrels can be purchased, and the correct headspace is set using a proprietary barrel nut design. The barrel is threaded to fit the Ruger action threads. This way, a competent gunsmith only needs an AR-15 barrel wrench and proper headspace gauges to fit a new barrel. This eliminates the need for machining by the gunsmith as with traditional barrel mounting solutions.

The RPR is compatible with AR-style handgrips, buttstocks and some types of handguards. The trigger is proprietary, but aftermarket triggers are available.

The RPR uses 10-round detachable Magpul PMAG polymer magazines.

== Precision Rimfire ==
Ruger Precision Rimfire
- Type: Bolt-action rifle
- Place of origin: United States

Production history
- Designed: 2017
- Manufacturer: Sturm, Ruger & Co.
- Unit cost: $619 MSRP
- Produced: 2017–Present

Specifications
- Mass: 6.8 lb (3.1 kg)
- Length: 38.63 in (98.1 cm)
- Barrel length: 18 in (46 cm)
- Cartridge: .17 HMR (9 rd. cap.).22 Long Rifle (10 rd. cap.).22 WMR/.22 WMRF (9 rd. cap.)
- Feed system: Rotary magazine 4 round capacity (unless otherwise noted above)
- Sights: None

The Ruger Precision Rimfire is a rimfire bolt-action rifle manufactured by Sturm, Ruger & Co. in the United States. The firearm has some visual similarities with the larger centerfire Ruger Precision Rifle, and both are marketed as budget precision rifles.

== Recalls ==
Ruger issued a safety bulletin for certain RPRs on 10 Aug 2017. The following serial number ranges are potentially affected: 1800-26274 to 1800-78345 or 1801-00506 to 1801-30461.

== Users ==
- People's Defence Forces
- Ukraine: Used by Ukrainian military during Russian invasion of Ukraine.
