= William B. Ruger =

American inventor (1916–2002)

- Ruger in 1975 holding that year's Outstanding American Handgunner Award
- Born: William Batterman Ruger; June 21, 1916; Brooklyn, New York, U.S.
- Died: July 6, 2002 (aged 86); Prescott, Arizona, U.S.
- Occupations: Inventor; industrialist; businessman
- Children: 3

William Batterman Ruger (June 21, 1916 – July 6, 2002) was an American firearms designer and entrepreneur, who partnered with Alexander McCormick Sturm to establish Sturm, Ruger & Company in 1949. Their first product was the Ruger Standard, the most popular .22 caliber target pistol ever made in the United States. After Sturm’s death in 1951, and under Ruger’s continued leadership, the company produced one of the widest varieties of firearms of any manufacturer in the world.

== Early life ==
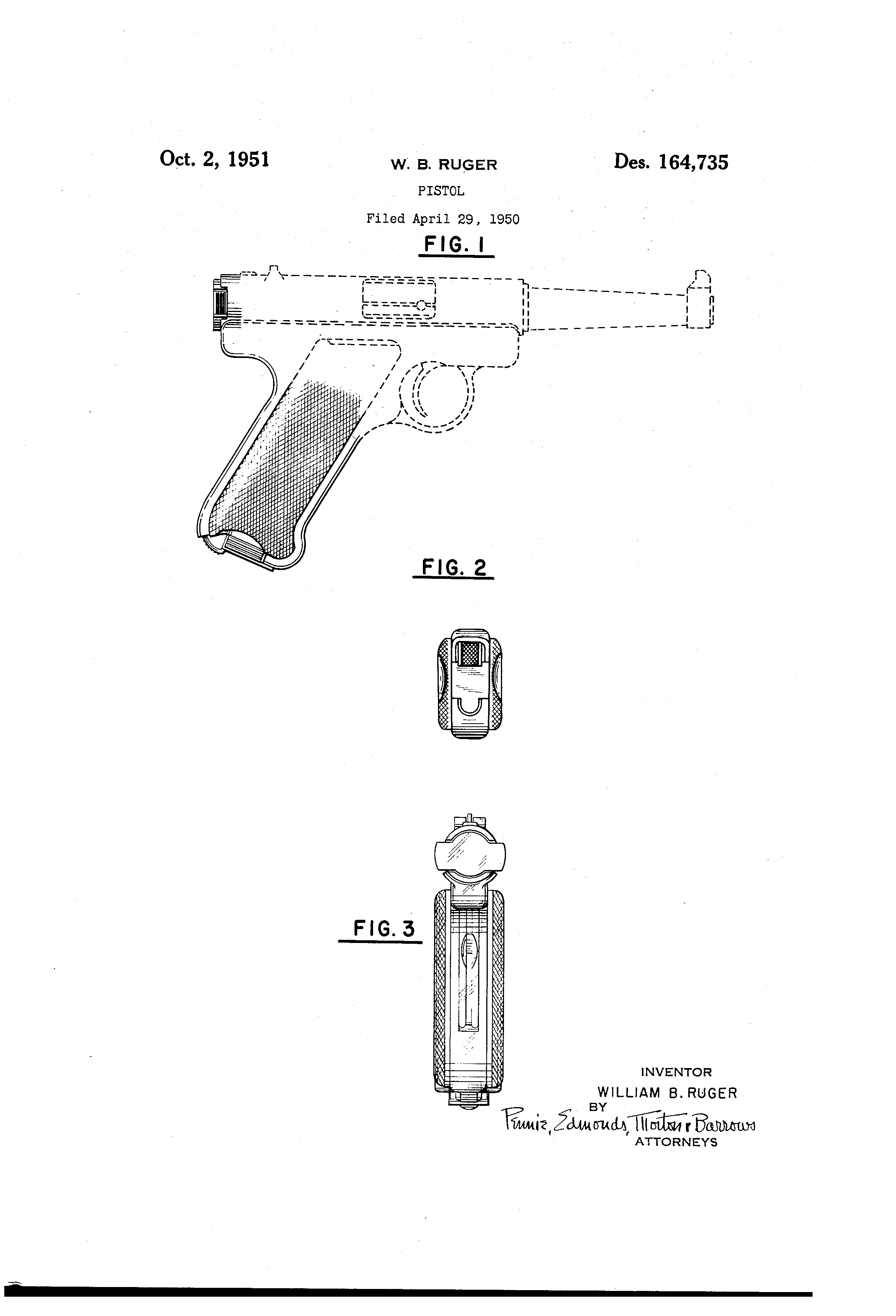
William B. Ruger's Standard Pistol 1951 Design Patent Drawing

Ruger was born on 21 June 1916 in Brooklyn, New York.

He learned to shoot at age 6, and he received his own Remington Model 12 from his father at the age of 12. He graduated from Alexander Hamilton High School in January 1936. Ruger attended the University of North Carolina at Chapel Hill, where he was a member of the Philanthropic Society, but did not graduate. As a student, he converted an empty room into a machine shop and, in 1938 came up with initial designs for what eventually became the experimental T10/T23E1 light machine gun for the United States Army, executing the drawings on his in-laws’ dining room table. U.S. Army Ordnance officials liked the gun design so much they hired Ruger as a gun designer at the Springfield Armory. Over a 53-year career, Ruger helped invent and patent dozens of models of sporting firearms, which were instant and enduring successes. From the start, his company stressed mechanical innovation and safety.

Ruger shared and exchanged technical information on firearms and ammunition with many like-minded people worldwide, including English rifle maker and cartridge designer David Lloyd.

When not involved with firearms operations, Ruger was deeply involved in a variety of activities, including antique firearms, 19th century Western American art, and his nationally noted antique car collection of more than 30 vehicles, including Bentleys, Rolls-Royces, Bugattis, Stutzes, and a 1913 Mercer Raceabout, among others.

Ruger supported and commissioned the design and construction of a classically styled sports touring car in 1970 that he called the Ruger Special. It was based on the design of the 1929 Bentley 4½ Litre. He also designed and commissioned a 92-foot (28 m) yacht, the Titania.

Ruger continued to lead his company to become the largest manufacturer of firearms in the United States.

== Philanthropy ==
Ruger was active in a wide variety of charities, especially in communities where his factories were located, as well as the Buffalo Bill Historical Center in Cody, Wyoming, where he served as a member of the board of trustees for over 15 years.

== Awards ==
Ruger received the following Shooting Industry Academy of Excellence Awards:

- Shooting Industry Award 1993 William B. Ruger
- Manufacturer of the Year: 1992, 1993
- Handgun of the Year: 1993 Ruger Vaquero, 1997 Ruger Bisley-Vaquero, 2001 Ruger Super Redhawk
- Rifle of the Year: 1999 Ruger .22 Magnum 10-22, 2002 Ruger 77/17RM .17 HMR Rimfire,
- Shotgun of the Year: 1992 Ruger Red Label sporting clays, 2002 Ruger Gold Label Side-By-Side

== Controversy ==
Ruger was widely criticized by gun owners for suggesting that rather than ban guns, Congress should outlaw magazines holding more than 15 rounds. On March 30, 1989, Ruger sent a letter to every member of the United States Congress, stating:

The best way to address the firepower concern is therefore not to try to outlaw or license many millions of older and perfectly legitimate firearms (which would be a licensing effort of staggering proportions) but to prohibit the possession of high capacity magazines. By a simple, complete and unequivocal ban on large capacity magazines, all the difficulty of defining 'assault rifle' and 'semi-automatic rifles' is eliminated. The large capacity magazine itself, separate or attached to the firearm, becomes the prohibited item. A single amendment to Federal firearms laws could effectively implement these objectives.

William B. Ruger

== Retirement and death ==
Health problems forced Ruger to retire in October 2000. On July 6, 2002, at age 86, he died in his home in Prescott, Arizona.

== Legacy ==
Ruger had a hand in the original design and styling of every firearm his company produced. He continued to work on new creations up until his death. He led his business from its inception to a corporation listed on the New York Stock Exchange (NYSE: RGR). As of 2008 the company had produced more than 20,000,000 firearms for hunting, target shooting, collecting, self-defense, law enforcement and for United States and foreign governments.

Sturm, Ruger has manufacturing plants in Newport, New Hampshire, Prescott, Arizona, and Mayodan, North Carolina, and corporate headquarters in Southport, Connecticut. It manufactures rifles, shotguns, pistols and revolvers for a variety of sporting and law enforcement purposes. Its precision investment castings are made for a variety of industries, including aerospace, automotive, general manufacturing and the golf market.

R. L. Wilson, firearms historian and Ruger's biographer, wrote of Ruger:

Ruger was a true firearms genius who mastered the disciplines of inventing, designing, engineering, manufacturing and marketing better than anyone since Samuel Colt. No one in the 20th century so clearly dominated the field, or was so skilled at articulating the unique appeal of quality firearms for legitimate uses.
