= Ruger American Rimfire =

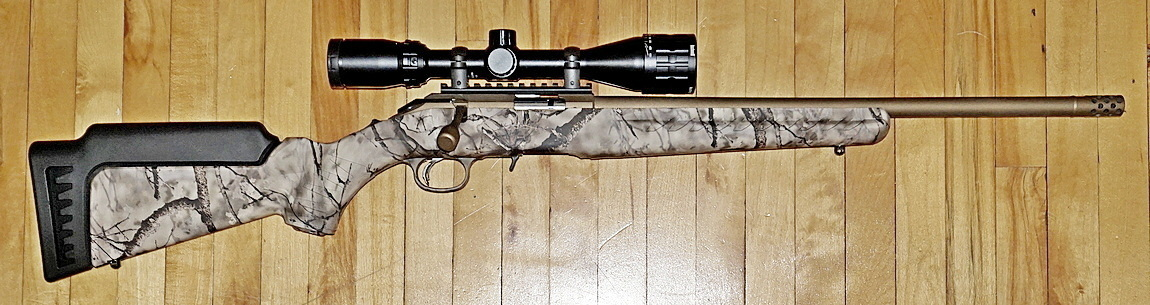
- Ruger American Rimfire Go Wild .22 LR
- Type: Bolt-action rifle
- Place of origin: United States

Production history
- Designed: 2011
- Manufacturer: Sturm, Ruger & Co.
- Unit cost: $449 MSRP
- Produced: 2012–Present

Specifications
- Mass: 6.25 lb (2.83 kg)
- Length: 42.5 in (108 cm)
- Barrel length: 22 in (56 cm)
- Cartridge: .17 HMR (9 rd. cap.).22 Long Rifle (10 rd. cap.).22 WMR/.22 WMRF (9 rd. cap.)
- Feed system: Rotary magazine 4 round capacity (unless otherwise noted above)
- Sights: None – Drilled and tapped for scope. (Weaver style bases supplied); Redfield Revolution riflescope available for all centerfire models

The Ruger American Rimfire is a rimfire bolt-action rifle manufactured by Sturm, Ruger & Co. in the United States. The firearm has some visual similarities with the larger centerfire Ruger American Rifle, and both are marketed as budget hunting rifles.

The stock of the Ruger American Rimfire has a V-shaped pillar bedding built according to the same "Power Bedding" principle as the larger Ruger American Rifle, but with different dimensions and with only one pillar which is placed on front of the magazine. It has the Ruger Marksman trigger and a tang safety. The bolt has a 70 degree bolt lift similar to its larger counterpart, but consists of only 8 parts (including the dowel pin and striker spring) for easier disassembly, and has a stainless steel single-extractor with a unique design. The barrel is press fitted into the receiver without threads in a similar fashion as the Anschütz Fortner. The magazine used on the American Rimfire is of the same BX series rotary magazines as the Ruger 10/22.

== Models ==
American Rimfire has several model lines, such as Standard, Compact, Wood Stock, OD Green, Stainless, Target and Go Wild.

- Standard: 18 in (460 mm) (threaded) or 22 in (560 mm) alloy steel barrel with the Ruger 10/22-style Williams™ fiber optic open sight, with an overall length of 37 in (940 mm) or 41 in (1,000 mm). Chambered for .17 HMR, .22 LR and .22 WMR. The buttstock piece can be removed and replaced between a straight flat comb (for use with iron sight) and a raised Monte Carlo-type comb (for use with optics).
- Compact: Essentially identical to the 18 in (460 mm) barrel Standard model but has a thinner butt end plate and thus a shorter length of pull (12.5 in (320 mm) instead of 13.75 in (349 mm)), with an overall length of 35.75 in (908 mm). The buttstock piece can be removed and swapped with a Standard model piece, which will convert the rifle into an 18 in (460 mm) barrel Standard model.
- Wood Stock: Essentially identical to the 22 in (560 mm) barrel Standard model but with a walnut stock instead of the black synthetic one. Available only in .22 LR caliber (Model 8329) via Ruger, but all of .22 LR (Model 8342), .22 WMR (Model 8345) and .17 HMR (Model 8346) are available in offer via TALO Distributors.
- OD Green: Officially designated as the Model 8334 (.22 LR) or 8335 (.22 WMR), it has the same dimensions as the 18 in (460 mm) barrel Standard model (and is under the "Standard" category on the Ruger website), but with a threaded varminter-style straight tapered barrel with no iron sights, and comes with factory Weaver rail installed. Because of the many similarities in appearance to the Predator model from the centerfire line, it has been nicknamed the "Rimfire Predator" by some users.
- Stainless: New addition to the lineup in 2017, the Stainless models are similar in appearance to the OD Green models with factory Weaver rail and a threaded 18" 416 stainless steel barrel with no iron sights, but has a black synthetic stock and also comes in .17 HMR (Model 8353) in addition to .22 LR (Model 8351) and .22 WMR (Model 8352). Furthermore, in October 2017 TALO Distributors introduced a special production run of stainless version Wood Stock models in .22 LR (Model 8359) and later in .22 WMR (Model 8364) and .17 HMR (Model 8365) that come fitted with an engraved walnut stock, 22 in (560 mm) barrel and open iron sights in addition to the receiver being drilled and tapped for scope bases.
- Target: Same dimensions as the 18 in (460 mm) barrel Standard model but with a threaded heavy bull barrel with no iron sights, as well as a black laminated stock with a straight comb and comes with factory Weaver rail installed. It is available for .22 LR (Model 8348) as well as .22 WMR (Model 8349) and .17 HMR (Model 8350) calibers. In late 2017, Ruger also introduced a thumbhole stock version for .22 LR (Model #8360) with a fenestrated fore-end and rollover cheekpiece. In early 2019, Ruger introduced stainless steel variants of all the previous four Target models.
- Go Wild: Offered in .22 LR, .22 WMR and .17 HMR, the new Ruger American Rimfire rifle Go Wild pairs the reliability of the Ruger rimfire platform with the popular style of the Go Wild Camo I-M Brush stock pattern. These three new rifles also boast a bronze cerakote finish and ship with a factory-installed muzzle brake.

== See also ==
- CZ 452
- Ruger 10/22
