= Ruger Bearcat =

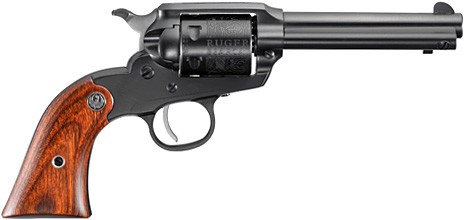
- Ruger New Bearcat - Blued
- Type: Single-action revolver
- Place of origin: United States

Production history
- Designer: William B. Ruger
- Designed: 1957–1958
- Manufacturer: Sturm, Ruger & Co.
- Unit cost: $49.50 (1958), $639 (2020)
- Produced: 1958: 1958–1971 (1^{st} issue); 1971–1975 (2^{nd} issue); 1993–present (3^{rd} issue)
- Variants: see variants: Bearcat, 1st issue; Super Bearcat, 2nd issue; New Bearcat, 3rd issue

Specifications
- Mass: 17 oz (480 g) (1^{st} issue); 22.5 oz (640 g) (2^{nd} issue); 24 oz (680 g) (3^{rd} issue)
- Length: 8.875 in (22.54 cm) (1^{st} issue); 8.875 in (22.54 cm) (2^{nd} issue); 9 in (23 cm) (3^{rd} issue)
- Barrel length: 4 in (10.16 cm) (1^{st} issue); 4 in (10.16 cm) (2^{nd} issue); 4.2 in (11 cm) (3^{rd} issue)
- Cartridge: .22 LR, .22 Long, .22 Short, .22 WMR
- Barrels: 1:16" RH
- Action: Single-action
- Feed system: 6-round cylinder

The Ruger Bearcat is a single-action, .22 caliber revolver manufactured by Sturm, Ruger & Co., introduced in 1958. It is based on the classic Remington single-action revolvers of the mid-19th century. Because of its compact size and frame, it is advertised as being ideal for hikers or campers in need of a .22 LR revolver, or "kit gun".

== Design ==
In 1974 Ruger patented a transfer bar safety system for their single-action revolvers and discontinued the production of the Bearcat, which was not readily adaptable to the new transfer bar design. In 1993, Ruger brought back the Bearcat as the New Bearcat, now incorporating the transfer bar system. Some time in the early 1980s, Bill Ruger gave an interview to a writer with the Ruger Collector's Association (RCA) and talked about the Bearcat. He said that the Bearcat was the first revolver for which the Ruger engineers developed the transfer bar and that they could easily have made it that way in 1974. They dropped it, Bill said, because of a mistake by the marketing department. When that department sent out the 1974 catalog and order forms to the distributors, they forgot to include the Bearcat. When the orders came back without orders for the Bearcat, they assumed that there was no demand and they dropped it. Today, only old members of the Ruger Collector's Association are aware of the true story of what really happened to the original Bearcat, since that story was published in the Ruger Collectors Journal and is a part of their history.

== Variants ==
=== Bearcat 1^{st} issue ===
The original Bearcat featured a fixed Patridge front sight, music wire coil springs, a non-fluted engraved cylinder, a square notched rear, and made with an alloy solid frame and uncheckered plastic grips. The grips would later be made from walnut.

=== Bearcat 2^{nd} issue ===
The Bearcat 2^{nd} issue was marketed in 1971 as an improved version of the original Bearcat, and renamed the Super Bearcat; it featured an all-steel frame rather than an alloy frame.

=== Bearcat 3^{rd} issue ===
The Bearcat 3^{rd} issue, also known as the New Bearcat, is Ruger's reintroduced model which came out in 1993. It features smooth rosewood grips with a Ruger medallion embedded. The New Bearcat also incorporated Ruger's new transfer bar safety system. It was offered with an additional .22 WMR cylinder, which was recalled by Ruger in April 1994 due to a concern the cylinders were improperly timed.

In 2002, Ruger began offering the Bearcat in stainless steel.

In 2008, a 50th Anniversary edition was released with gold-filled script and special engravings, with 2,539 units produced.

In 2015, Ruger introduced a variant of the Bearcat with adjustable sights, addressing a longstanding criticism of the limitations of the fixed sights.
