= Ruger LC9 =

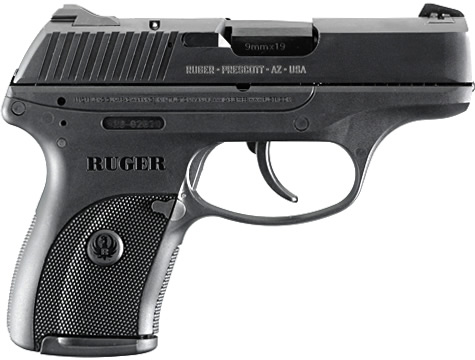
- Ruger LC9 – standard
- Type: Semi-automatic pistol
- Place of origin: United States

Production history
- Manufacturer: Sturm, Ruger & Co.
- Produced: 2011–2014
- Variants: LC380, LC9s, EC9s

Specifications
- Mass: 17.1 oz (480 g)
- Length: 6.00 in (152 mm)
- Barrel length: 3.12 in (79 mm)
- Width: 0.9 in (23 mm)
- Height: 4.5 in (110 mm)
- Cartridge: 9×19mm.380 ACP (LC380)
- Action: Short recoil
- Feed system: 7- and 9-round box magazines
- Sights: Iron sights

The Ruger LC9 (standing for "Lightweight Compact 9mm") is a 9mm caliber, recoil-operated, locked breech, hammer fired, semi-automatic pistol. It was first announced by Sturm, Ruger & Co. at the 2011 SHOT Show.

== Overview ==
The LC9 has a 3.12-inch (8 cm) barrel, and is 6 inches (15 cm) long and 4.5 inches (11 cm) tall. The LC9 is 0.9 inches (2 cm) wide, and weighs 17.1 ounces (485 g) with an empty magazine.

It features a black polymer (glass-filled nylon) frame and blued alloy steel slide and barrel.

The gun ships with one magazine, including two interchangeable base pads—one that fits flush with the frame, and the other (fitted to the magazine from the factory) that provides a grip extension of about 0.5 inches (1 cm).

This pistol has safety features, including a loaded chamber indicator and magazine disconnect safety, that allow it to be also sold in California and Massachusetts.

In 2013, Ruger released a 9-round extended magazine for the LC9.

It includes safety features such as a loaded chamber indicator and a magazine disconnect safety.

== Variants ==
=== LC380 ===
The LC380 is a .380 ACP caliber pistol that has the more advanced design elements of the LC9 compared to the more basic design of the Ruger LCP.

Its frame is exactly the same as the original Ruger LC9.

=== LC9s ===
The LC9s is a striker-fired single action only version of the LC9 announced July 29, 2014.

The LC9s fixed the most common customer complaint about the LC9, the trigger pull and removes the loaded chamber indicator located on the top of the LC9 behind the ejection port in favor of a visual inspection port.

=== EC9s ===
The EC9s (the E standing for Essential) is a lower cost version of the LC9s with fixed sights, fewer and wider cocking serrations and a black oxide finish.

The EC9s is otherwise identical to the LC9s accepting the same magazines and all external accessories as the LC9s.

== Accolades ==
The Ruger LC9 was chosen as the Shooting Industry Academy of Excellence's Handgun of the Year in 2011.
