= Ruger SR-Series =

Ruger SR9
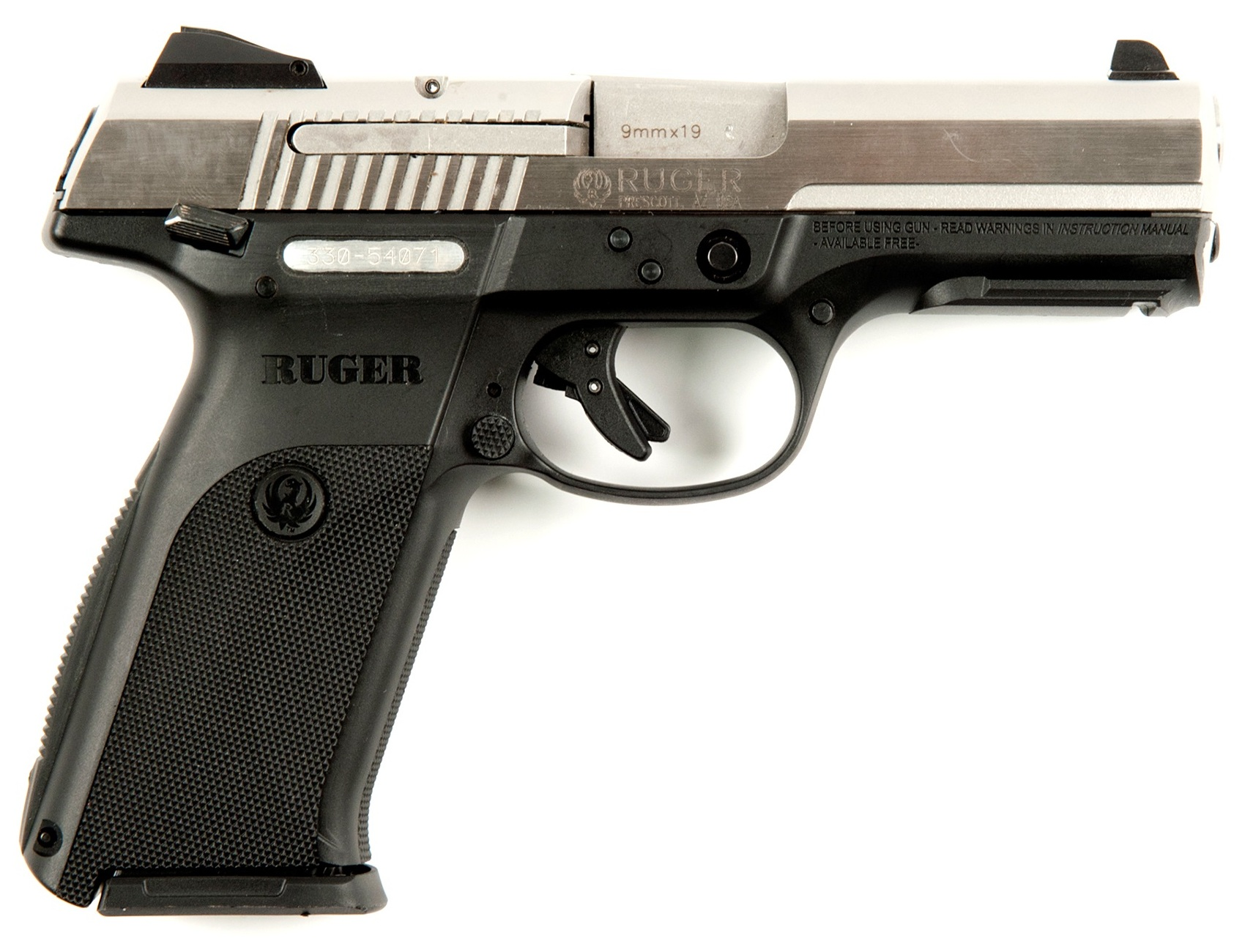
- Ruger SR-9, firing 9×19mm
- Type: Semi-automatic pistol
- Place of origin: United States

Production history
- Manufacturer: Sturm, Ruger
- Produced: 2007–2019
- Variants: See Variants

Specifications
- Cartridge: 9×19mm Parabellum SR9, SR9c.40 S&W SR40, SR40c.45 ACP SR45
- Action: Short recoil, locked breech
- Feed system: detachable box magazine: 9mm: 10 or 17 rounds; .40 S&W: 9 or 15 rounds; .45 ACP: 10+1 rounds
- Sights: Iron sights

The Ruger SR-Series is a line of semi-automatic pistols manufactured by Sturm, Ruger & Company. At 1.18 in (30.0 mm) thick through the grip, it is touted by Ruger as one of the thinnest double-stack pistols available. The SR-series has been marketed as a backup/concealment weapon for law enforcement as well as for civilian concealed carry. The Ruger SR9 chambered for the 9×19mm Parabellum cartridge was introduced in October 2007, and the slightly smaller SR9c came out in January 2010. The Ruger SR40 chambered for the .40 S&W cartridge came out in October 2010, and the compact SR40c in June 2011.

== History ==
=== Development ===
Starting in the early 2000s, the rapid growth of legislation and regulations allowing concealed carry by law-abiding citizens in various jurisdictions created a large market for handguns manufactured specifically for such use. Desirable characteristics for firearms of this type include: small size, thinness, high magazine capacity, lightweight construction (often achieved through the use of polymer frames), stealthy darkened stainless steel slides, high visibility and/or night sights, and large ergonomic ambidextrous manual thumb safeties and magazine releases. Ruger specifically designed the SR9 pistol to address the very active and profitable concealed-carry handgun market segment and it possesses the majority of the aforementioned attributes.

=== Recall ===
On April 9, 2008, Ruger recalled the SR9 model because, under certain conditions, it can fire if dropped with the manual safety off and a round in the chamber. This condition can occur in pistols manufactured from October 2007 to April 2008. Ruger designed a new trigger group which corrects this issue. It includes, among other things, adding a pivoting inner blade to the trigger itself, similar to that on the Glock pistol. This blade must be depressed to allow the trigger to be pulled. It also serves as an overtravel stop. Ruger also redesigned the magazine release, magazine disconnect & disconnect spring, and the striker blocker and striker blocker spring. Ruger initially announced that, beginning in mid-May 2008, they would retrofit SR9 pistols having a serial number below 330-30000 with the new parts, and include a spare magazine free of charge (approximately 11,000 pistols). SR9 pistols with serial numbers of 330-30000 and higher were manufactured with the safety enhancements and are not subject to the recall. Ruger began shipping recall boxes to customers in July 2008. Some of the early SR9 pistols had a different magazine latch and were upgraded to the new style, allowing the use of early and later SR9 magazines.

=== Discontinuation ===
In 2017, twelve years after its introduction, Ruger discontinued the SR-Series of handguns. This was presumably because Ruger wanted to focus on the higher-end Ruger American Pistol and the cheaper Ruger Security-9, introduced in that same year.

== Design details ==
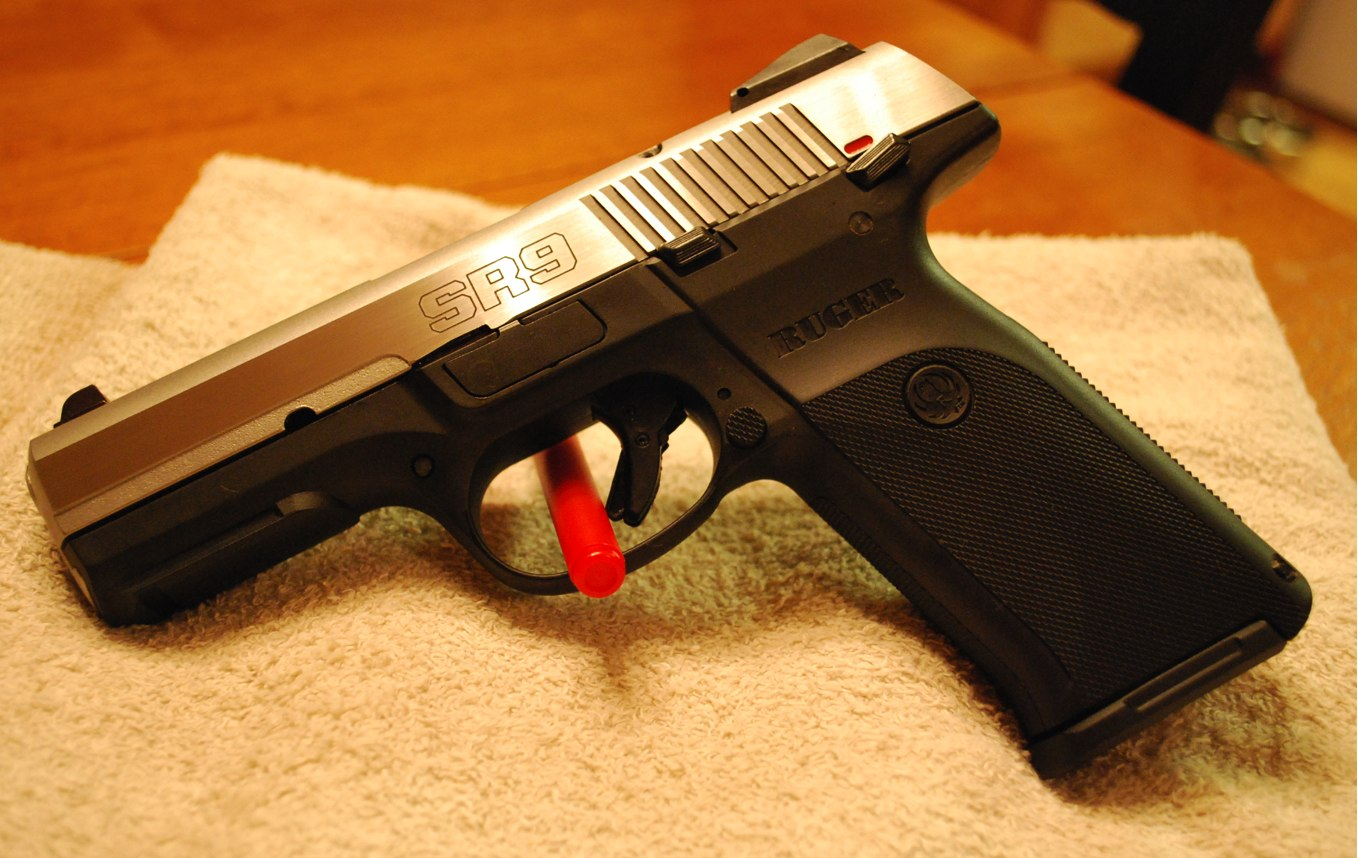
Ruger SR9 with brushed stainless steel slide

The SR9 is the first large-caliber striker fired pistol designed and manufactured by Sturm Ruger. Similar to Glock's "safe action", the SR9 striker-fired features a pre-set trigger. With this type of action, the striker is partially cocked when the slide is cycled, then is fully cocked and released when the trigger is pulled. Due to safety concerns, the moderately long and heavy trigger pull of this type is seen as ideal for law enforcement and self-defense applications. The SR9 and SR9c have identical trigger groups. Enthusiast website Gunblast rated both the SR9 and SR9c examples it tested with a factory trigger rearward travel at 9.5 mm (0.37 in). Gunblast rated its SR9 example with a trigger pull of 30 N (6.7 lb_{f}), and Gunblast rated its SR9c example with a trigger pull of 23 N (5.2 lb_{f}). Gunblast's SR40 example was rated with a trigger pull of 29.5 N (6.6 lb_{f}). The difference in trigger-pull is most likely due to variances between individual guns, and not to a change in specs by Ruger between the models. The trigger travel is 7.8 mm (0.31 in).

The SR9 is recoil operated with a locked breech. It features a staggered column box magazine (double-stack magazine) with a capacity of 17 rounds, and is also available in a 10-round configuration for locales where capacities are restricted. The pistol has a very low slide profile; this holds the barrel axis close to the shooter's hand and makes the Ruger SR9 more comfortable to shoot by reducing muzzle rise and allowing for faster aim recovery in rapid shooting sequences. The slide is available in either brushed or blackened through-hardened stainless steel, and the frame is fiberglass-reinforced nylon polymer, resistant to warping or failure. The frame is offered in black or olive drab. The SR9 also has a reversible backstrap which allows the owner to select either a flat or arched grip housing, based on personal preference. In addition, the SR9 sports a Picatinny rail for the mounting of laser sights and tactical lights.

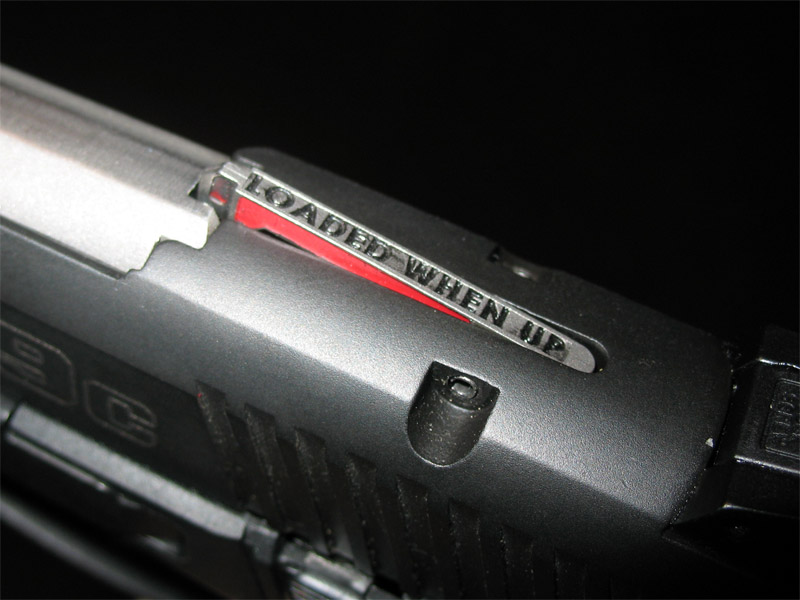
Loaded chamber indicator indicating a cartridge present in the chamber of a SR9c.

The SR9 has multiple safety devices, such as an ambidextrous manual thumb safety and magazine release, a loaded chamber indicator, a visual and tactile cocked-striker indicator, and a firing pin block safety which prevents the pistol from firing if it is accidentally dropped. The SR9 also features a magazine disconnector. The Ruger SR9 can safely be dry fired with an empty magazine in the pistol. A Ruger-issued warning states that, due to the disconnector, dry firing the pistol without the magazine inserted will cause unnecessary wear to the striker block, but published firearms industry information notes that the SR9's disconnect can be deactivated simply by removing some of the disconnector linkage. Disabling the magazine disconnect allows a chambered round to fire even if magazine is removed. This can be inherently dangerous, given accidental discharge risk. (In tactical terms, it permits a near empty magazine to be ejected and replaced, having a fireable round chambered during exchange, which is useful in many situations) .

The SR9's open iron sights are of the three-dot enhanced contrast variety, and offer drift adjustment on both front and rear blades for windage, as well as rear-sight adjustment for elevation.

== Variants ==
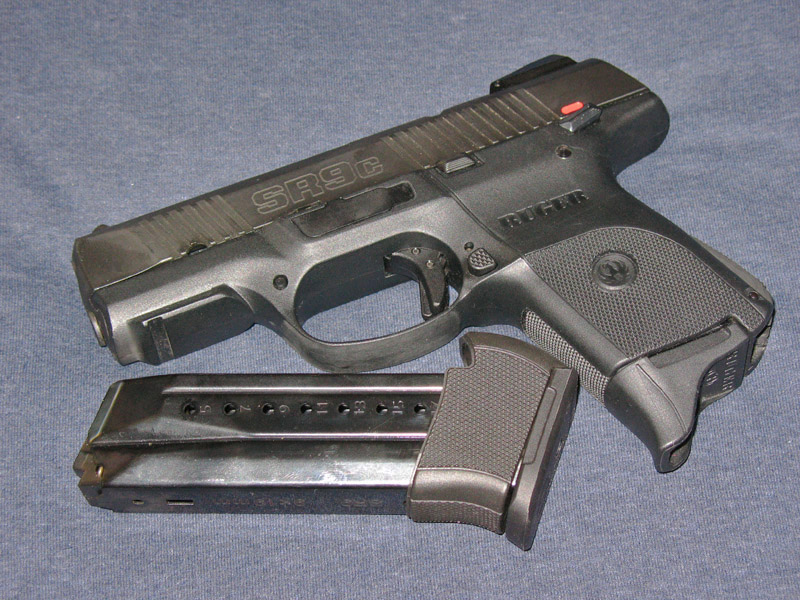
The compact version SR9c with blackened stainless steel slide and with factory full-sized magazine shown below. On the magazine is the grip adapter.

- The Ruger SR9 started to ship in October 2007. It is the first model of the Ruger SR-series. The full-size Ruger SR9 is chambered in 9×19mm Parabellum, and it is shipped with two 17-round, flush-fit magazines and a loading tool. An economy version of the SR9, the 9E, was released in 2014.
- The Ruger SR9c started to ship in January 2010, according to Ruger. The SR9c is lighter and dimensionally smaller compared to the SR9, but it has the same grip width (measured across safety levers) as the full-sized SR9. The manual safety, adjustable rear sights, and updated version of the trigger are all present in the compact version also. In contrast to the SR9 recoil spring assembly, the SR9c pistols are fitted with a dual recoil spring assembly. The SR9c is normally supplied with two magazines. The standard 10-round compact magazine features a flat bottom floor plate, with an extended floor plate also included. The second magazine is a full-size 17-round unit featuring a grip adapter that transforms the short compact SR9c grip into a full-sized grip. However, in jurisdictions where the number of rounds in a firearm is limited by law, the SR9c is shipped from Ruger with two 10-round magazines and two extended floor plates. Additional retraction grooves (serrations) are located on the front sides of the SR9c slide, making it easier to operate, The round-in-chamber indicator eliminates need to press check, also allowing tactile round-in-chamber check—even in complete darkness—by raising forefinger to feel if indicator is in raised position or not.(which is useful in both law enforcement and home defense) (See image) The Ruger SR9c was chosen as the Shooting Industry Academy of Excellence's Handgun of the Year in 2010.
- The Ruger SR40 started to ship in October 2010 to dealers. This is a full-size variant chambered in .40 S&W. The full-size .40 S&W magazines hold 15 rounds. The SR40 ships with two 15-round, flush-fit magazines and a loading tool. The basic overall dimensions and barrel length of the SR40 are the same as for the SR9, though the through-hardened stainless-steel slide was modified and is 0.060 in (1.5 mm) wider than the slide of the SR9. According to Ruger, the added mass of the SR40 slide reduces slide velocity during cycling to help reduce felt recoil and increase service life expectancy.
- The Ruger SR40c started to ship in June 2011. Like the SR9c is to the SR9, the SR40c is a compact version of the SR40. It is dimensionally equal to the SR9c; and unlike the SR40 is to the SR9, it also weighs the same. The SR40c ships standard with a 9-round magazine with an optional extended baseplate, as well as a full-size 15-round SR40 magazine with a removable sleeve. In jurisdictions that prohibit large-capacity magazines, it ships with two 9-round magazines and two extended baseplates instead.
- The Ruger SR45 chambered in .45 ACP was announced in January 2013 and first appeared at the 2013 SHOT Show annual tradeshow for the shooting, hunting, and firearms industry. It has a capacity of 10+1 rounds.

== Chronograph results ==
Chronograph testing a SR9 pistol with various cartridge loadings produced the following results:

Brand / type	Bullet weight (Grains) / type	Velocity (ft/s - 10 feet (3.0 m) from muzzle)
Buffalo Bore +P+	115 Gr HP	1387.5
Buffalo Bore +P	115 Gr HP	1182
Buffalo Bore +P+	124 Gr HP	1280.8
Cor-Bon	80 Gr Glaser	1537.1
Cor-Bon	115 Gr HP	1341
Cor-Bon	100 Gr PowRBall	1428.6
Extreme Shock	115 Gr EPR	1245.6
International Cartridge	100 Gr HP	1183
