= Ruger RXM =

- Type: Pistol
- Place of origin: United States

Production history
- Manufacturer: Ruger
- Produced: 2024–present
- Variants: Compact, full size models

Specifications
- Length: 7.13 in (181 mm) (compact model)
- Barrel length: 3.88 in (99 mm) (compact model)
- Width: 1.25 in (32 mm)
- Height: 5 in (130 mm) (compact model)
- Cartridge: 9×19mm
- Feed system: Glock-pattern box magazine
- Sights: Adjustable iron sights

The Ruger RXM (also stylized RxM) is a modular, striker-fired 9mm caliber semi-automatic pistol manufactured by Ruger, in collaboration with Magpul. It is based on the third-generation Glock 19, with which it shares some parts compatibility. As of January 2026, it is available in full size and compact configurations.

== Design ==
The RXM is based on the third-generation Glock 19, and shares some parts compatibility with that generation. Unlike the Glock on which it is based, it features a separate serialized fire control unit (like the Sig Sauer P320, P365, Beretta APX and Springfield Armory Echelon) allowing for interchangeable grip modules. The grip modules, produced by Magpul, are available in full size and compact lengths, with a subcompact grip announced (but unavailable as of December 2025.) The grips are available in gray, black, dark earth and olive drab green. RXM slides also feature an optics cut that allows for configuration to several standard footprints, allowing the mounting of a range of optical sights.

== Reception ==
The RXM has generally been received positively, with reviewers citing its combination of a Glock action with modern features such as a fire control unit, and a factory optic cut slide.
