= Ruger Gold Label =

- Type: Double barreled shotgun
- Place of origin: United States

Production history
- Manufacturer: Sturm, Ruger
- Produced: 2002 – 2006

Specifications
- Mass: 6½ pounds
- Length: 45½ inches
- Barrel length: 28 inches
- Caliber: 12 gauge
- Action: Break-action

The Ruger Gold Label was a side-by-side double-barreled shotgun that was made by Sturm, Ruger & Company, Incorporated, at their manufacturing facility in Newport, New Hampshire. It was designed to be similar to traditional English shotguns used for upland bird hunting and for clay target games such as sporting clays.

== Features ==
The Gold Label has a stainless steel receiver and blued barrels. The stock and fore-end are made of AAA-grade American walnut. At 6½ pounds, the Gold Label is relatively lightweight for a double barreled shotgun.

Equipped with a single trigger, a barrel selector mechanism is used to choose whether the left or right barrel fires first. The second shot can be fired even if the first shot was a misfire and the shotgun has not recoiled. The barrel selector is combined with the manual safety and is located at the top rear of the receiver, behind the top lever. Opening the action automatically engages the safety mechanism.

Only produced in 12 gauge, the chambers are three inches in length, to accommodate either 2¾ inch or 3 inch shells. The Gold Label uses screw-in choke tubes that are steel shot compatible.

== Models ==
There are two models of Gold Label. One has an American style pistol grip stock. The other has an English style straight grip stock. Both models have a splinter style fore-end.

The Gold Label was produced from 2004 to 2006 and has not been produced since. While the shotgun was still pictured in Ruger's 2008 Catalog, it was listed as "current production sold out, anticipate availability in 2009." According to most reports, the Gold Label will not be produced again due to its high cost of manufacturing.

== Awards ==
In 2002, the Gold Label was named Shotgun of the Year by Shooting Industry News. In 2005, it won the "Golden Bullseye" Shotgun of the Year award from American Rifleman magazine.
