= Ruger LCP =

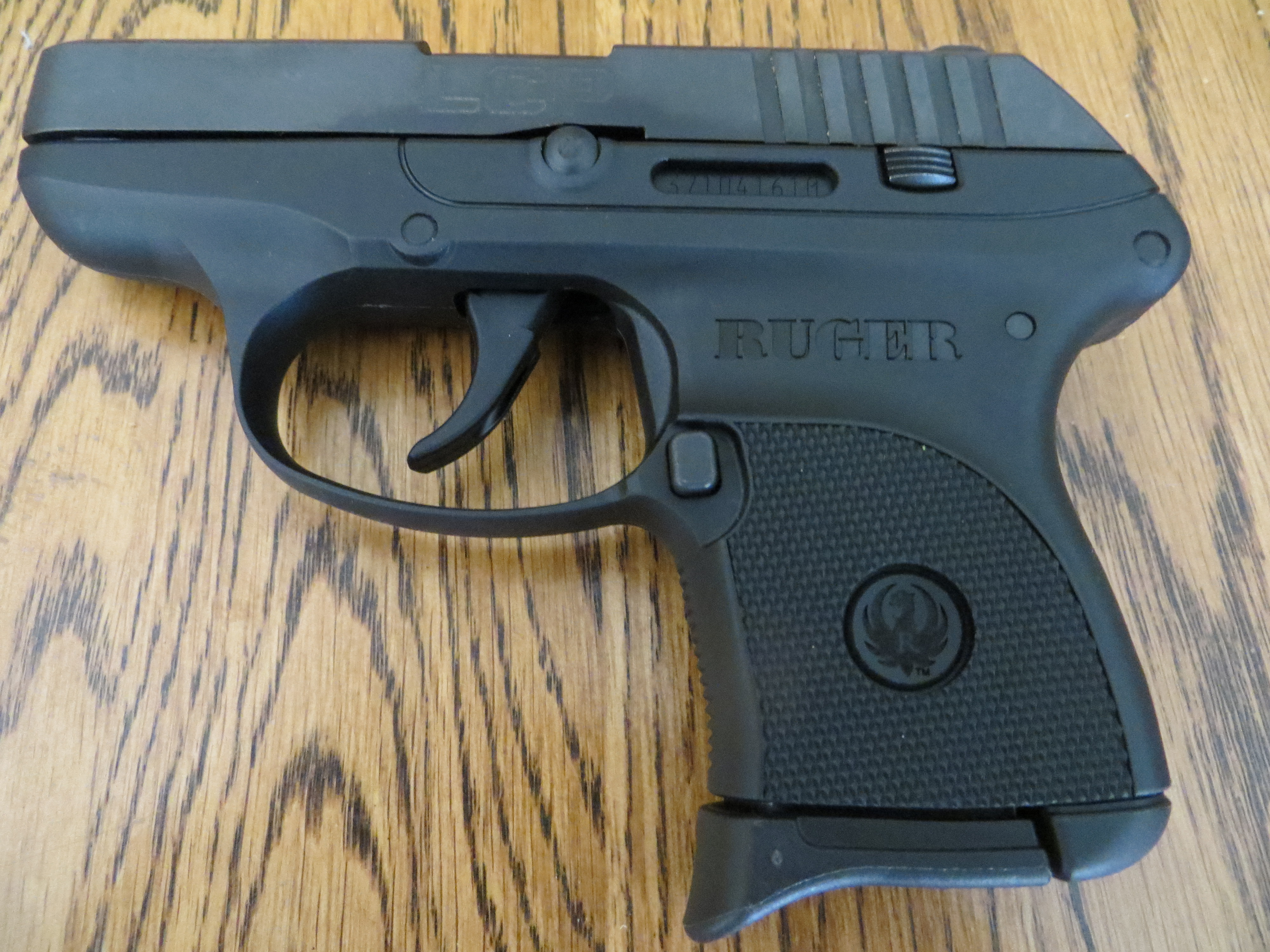
- Ruger LCP 380 Pistol
- Type: Semi-automatic pistol
- Place of origin: United States

Production history
- Manufacturer: Ruger
- Produced: 2008–present
- Variants: LCP II (2016), LCP Max (2021)

Specifications
- Mass: 9.4 oz (270 g)
- Length: 5.16 in (131 mm)
- Barrel length: 2.75 in (70 mm) (LCP & LCP II); 2.8 in (71 mm) (LCP Max)
- Width: .82 in (21 mm)
- Height: 3.6 in (91 mm)
- Cartridge: .380 ACP
- Action: Short recoil, DAO
- Feed system: Detachable box magazine; capacities: 6+1 rounds (standard); 7+1 rounds (extended); 10+1 rounds (LCP Max standard); 12+1 rounds (LCP Max extended)
- Sights: Fixed (LCP & LCP II); Adjustable rear (LCP Max)

The Ruger LCP (Lightweight Compact Pistol) is a subcompact .380 ACP pocket pistol manufactured by Sturm, Ruger & Co. It was introduced at the 2008 SHOT Show.

== Overview ==
With an overall length of 5.16 inches (131 mm) and weighing only 9.4 oz (270 g), this is Ruger's first entry into the field of tiny, ultra-light defensive pistols. The LCP, which stands for "Lightweight Compact Pistol", was designed in direct response to customer requests for a compact firearm for use by police as a back-up, and a defensive handgun for civilian concealed carry needs.

The pistol has a glass-filled nylon frame, a two-finger grip, and a through-hardened blued steel slide. It is similar in appearance to the Kel-Tec P-3AT, which weighs 8.3 ounces (240 g), and features a similar tension spring for the lightweight hammer, an identical locked breech mechanism, and a similar takedown method. The main differences are the Glock style extractor and the incorporation of an external slide stop on the LCP. It is also possible to tell if there is a round chambered by looking at the "view hole" next to the extractor.

In 2013, a seven-round extended magazine was released for the LCP.

=== Restrictions ===
Only the LCP II chambered in .22 LR is available in California and Massachusetts.

== Recall ==
On October 29, 2008, Ruger announced a recall of some of the LCP pistols with serial number prefixes less than "371-xxxxx" due to the possibility of some of the guns discharging if dropped onto a hard surface. The recall announcement stated that Ruger would upgrade the hammer system, make other unspecified improvements, and compensate the owner by providing a grip extension, which may be attached to the provided magazine. Upgraded models have a diagonal square marking in the hammer area.

== Variants ==
=== Coyote Special edition ===
In April 2010, Texas Governor Rick Perry brought further spotlight to the weapon when he used it to shoot a coyote that was menacing him and his daughter's Labrador Retriever during a morning jog near Austin. Neither Perry, his daughter, or his dog were injured, and the governor claims to have left the dead coyote where it fell, stating that "he became mulch". Ruger has since released a "Coyote Special" edition of the gun to commemorate Perry's encounter.

=== Second Generation ===
In 2013, Ruger modified the original LCP to include more prominent sights and a shortened trigger pull. The second generation LCP pistols can be identified by serial numbers which lack the hyphen that was present in the serials of first generation LCPs.

=== LCP Custom ===
In 2015, Ruger introduced the LCP Custom model. It is easily distinguishable by its red hard anodized aluminum trigger which features a shorter improved geometry pull. The LCP Custom also features improved higher profile sights. The replaceable front sight is attached in the same manner as a Glock front sight, and is compatible with the Glock sight removal tool. The rear sight is also replaceable and is affixed with a dove tail slot. The front sight of the LCP Custom is phosphorescent "glow in the dark", while the rear sight is plain black. This model was discontinued with the introduction of the LCP II.

== LCP II ==
Ruger LCP II
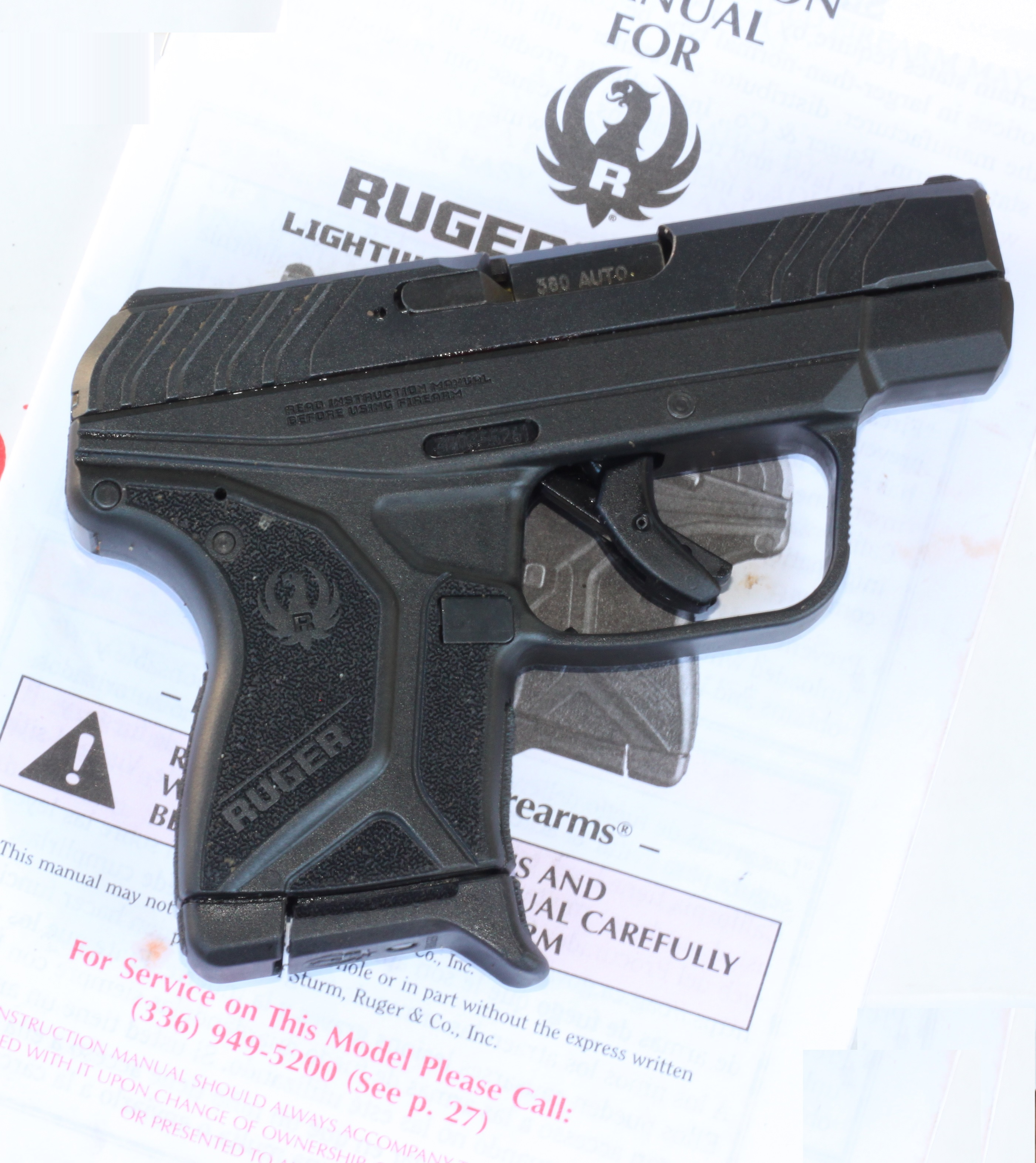
- Type: Pistol
- Place of origin: United States

Production history
- Manufacturer: Ruger
- Produced: 2016–present

Specifications
- Mass: 10.6 oz (300 g)
- Length: 5.17 in (131 mm)
- Barrel length: 2.75 in (70 mm)
- Width: 0.75 in (19 mm) (slide only)
- Height: 3.71 in (94 mm)
- Cartridge: .380 ACP.22 LR
- Action: single action
- Feed system: Detachable box magazine; capacities: 6+1 rounds (standard); 7+1 rounds (extended); 10+1 rounds (.22 LR only)
- Sights: Fixed iron sights

Introduced on October 6, 2016, the slightly larger LCP II features a number of updates, including locking the slide back when empty. The LCP II is compatible with the original 6-round LCP magazines (but not the extended 7-round magazines), however, it will not lock the slide back when using original LCP magazines, as the original LCP lacked the feature.

== LCP Max ==
In June 2021, Ruger introduced a new double stack model, the LCP Max. It weighs 10.6 oz (300 g), is 0.81 in (21 mm) wide, and is capable of holding 10 rounds (12 rounds in an extended magazine). It also features improved magazine feed lips, feed ramp, extractor, barrel cam geometries, slide serrations, a Tritium "night sight" on the front, and a reversible magazine release.

== See also ==
- Ruger LCR
- Ruger LC9
- Ruger LC380
