= Sturm, Ruger & Co. =

American firearm manufacturing company

Sturm, Ruger & Company, Inc.
- Type: Public
- Traded as: NYSE: RGR
- Industry: Firearms
- Founded: 1949; 77 years ago in Southport, Connecticut
- Founders: William B. Ruger, Alexander McCormick Sturm
- Headquarters: Mayodan, North Carolina, U.S.
- Area served: Worldwide
- Key people: Ronald C. Whitaker (Chairman); Christopher J. Killoy (President and CEO)
- Products: Revolvers, pistols, rifles, shotguns
- Revenue: $664 million (2016)
- Operating income: $596 million (2022)
- Net income: $88 million (2016)
- Owner: Beretta Holding (9.95%)
- Number of employees: 2,120 (2016)
- Subsidiaries: Marlin Firearms
- Website: www.ruger.com

Sturm, Ruger & Company, Inc., better known by the shortened name Ruger, is an American firearm manufacturing company based in Mayodan, North Carolina, with production facilities also in Newport, New Hampshire; Mayodan, North Carolina; Hebron, Kentucky; and Prescott, Arizona. The company was founded in 1949 by Alexander McCormick Sturm and William B. Ruger and has been publicly traded since 1969.

Ruger produces bolt-action, semi-automatic, and single-shot rifles, semi-automatic pistols, and single- and double-action revolvers. According to the ATF statistics for 2022, Ruger is the largest firearm manufacturer in the United States, surpassing Smith & Wesson.

On October 14, 2026, Ruger announced they were discontinuing most of their firearms, including the SR1911, LC Carbine, PC Charger, PC Carbine, LC Charger, Redhawk, Super Redhawk, Blackhawk, Super Blackhawk, Single-Series revolvers, Vaquero, No. 1, 77-Series rifles, Hawkeye and Ruger Precision Rifle.

== History ==
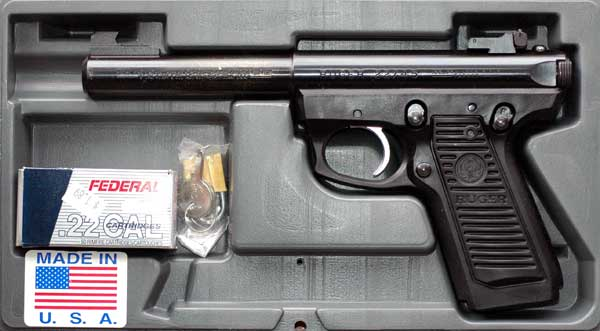
Ruger's MK II 22/45 target pistol.

Sturm, Ruger & Company was founded by William B. Ruger and Alexander McCormick Sturm in 1949 in a small rented machine shop in Southport, Connecticut.

Just before their partnership, Bill Ruger had successfully duplicated two Japanese "baby" Nambu pistols in his garage, from a captured Nambu that he acquired from a returning Marine, at the close of World War II. When it came to designing the Company's first product, Bill Ruger designed a semi-auto pistol that incorporated the looks of the German 9mm Luger P08 and the American Colt Woodsman into their first commercially produced .22 caliber pistol (see Ruger Standard), which became so successful that it launched the entire company.

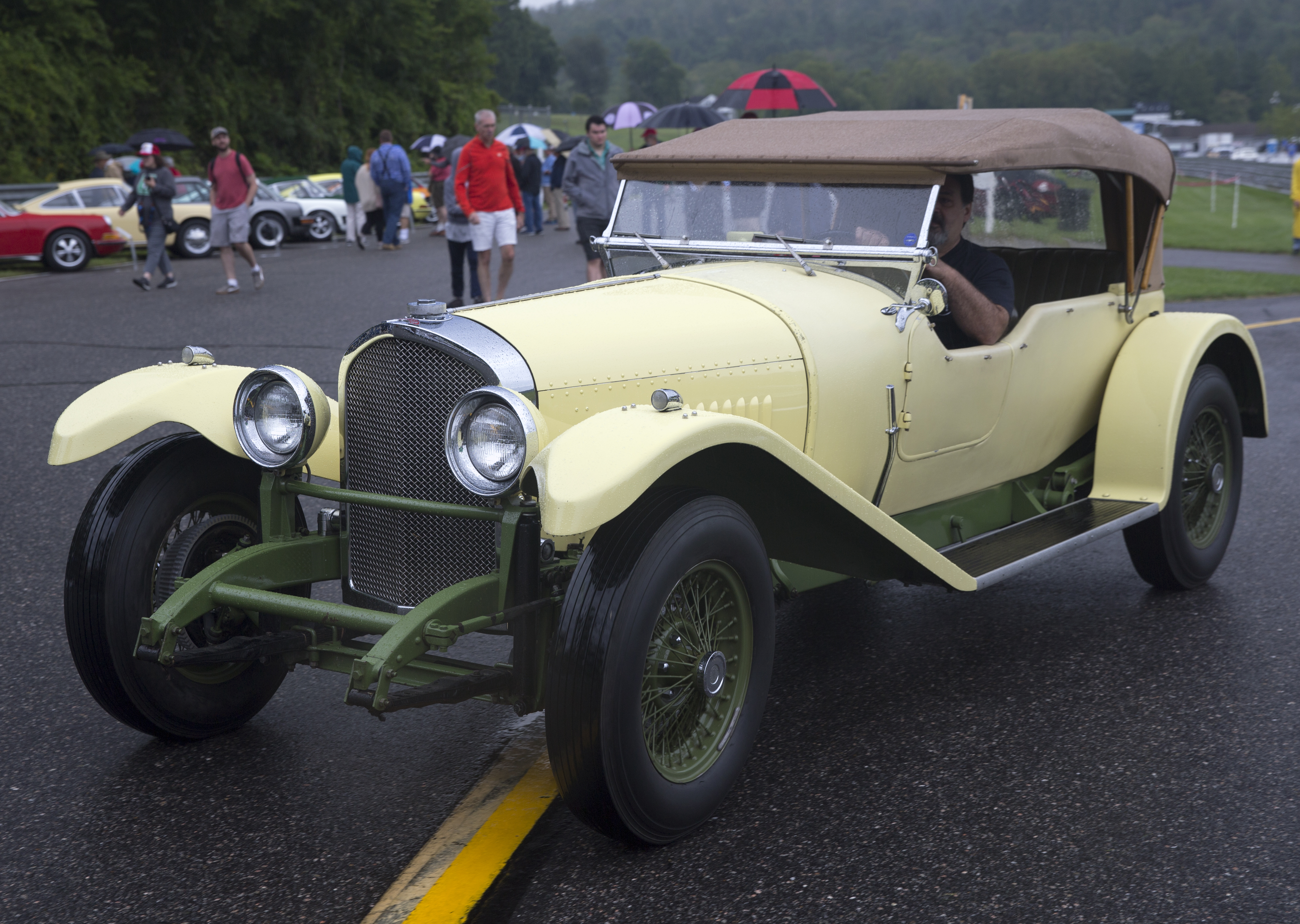
The 1970 Ruger Sports Tourer was a brief attempt by Ruger at building a high-end, retro car. In the end, only two prototypes were made.

Ruger is a dominant manufacturer in the .22 LR rimfire rifle market in the U.S., due primarily to the sales of its Ruger 10/22 semiautomatic rifle. The 10/22 is very popular due to its reputation for being relatively inexpensive and of high quality. As a result, a wealth of after-market accessories and parts were made available for it, which has further increased its popularity.

Ruger similarly dominates the .22 rimfire semi-automatic pistol market with the Ruger Mark IV, a descendant of the Ruger Standard pistol. Like the 10/22, the Mark Series is supported with a wide variety of aftermarket accessories. The 22/45 is similar to the Ruger Standard family of pistols but features a different grip angle, that of the Colt 1911 (as opposed to that of a Luger utilized in the Ruger Standard).

Ruger is also renowned for the production of high-quality revolvers, such as the GP100 and Redhawk lines. They also have some presence in the semi-auto pistol market, with the SR1911 and SR22 lines of handguns.

From 1949 through 2004, Ruger manufactured over 20 million firearms. The company is headquartered in Southport, Connecticut, and maintains manufacturing facilities in Newport, New Hampshire; Prescott, Arizona; and Mayodan, North Carolina. Ruger's subsidiaries are Ruger Precision Metals LLC in Earth City, Missouri, Pine Tree Castings in Newport, New Hampshire, and Ruger Sportswear & Accessories in Mayodan, North Carolina. Ruger's Pine Tree Castings division makes ferrous, ductile iron, and commercial titanium castings. Ruger had a division known as Ruger Golf, making steel and titanium castings for golf clubs made by several different brands in the 1990s.

Sturm, Ruger stock has been publicly traded since 1969 and became a New York Stock Exchange company in 1990 (NYSE:RGR). After Alex Sturm died in 1951, William B. Ruger continued to direct the company until he died in 2002.

In September 2020, the company bought the Marlin Firearms company from bankrupt Remington Outdoor Company. Just one year after the acquisition of Marlin, Ruger introduced the first Ruger-made Marlin lever-action rifle, the Model 1895 SBL.

In 2024, Ruger celebrated their 75th anniversary.

== Statistics ==
Ruger was ranked the number one U.S. firearms manufacturer from 2008 to 2011. In 2011, Ruger manufactured 1,114,687 firearms, as their promotion, the "Million Gun Challenge to Benefit the NRA", played a significant role in the company maintaining its top U.S. manufacturer status. The company has set a new goal of 2 million firearms produced per year. From 2009 to 2012, Ruger was the top-seller of handguns.

== Products ==
Ruger breaks down its products into nine categories:

- bolt-action rifles
- autoloading rifles
- lever-action rifles
- single-shot rifles
- shotguns
- centerfire pistols
- rimfire pistols
- double-action revolvers
- single-action revolvers

=== Rifles ===
==== Bolt-action rifles ====
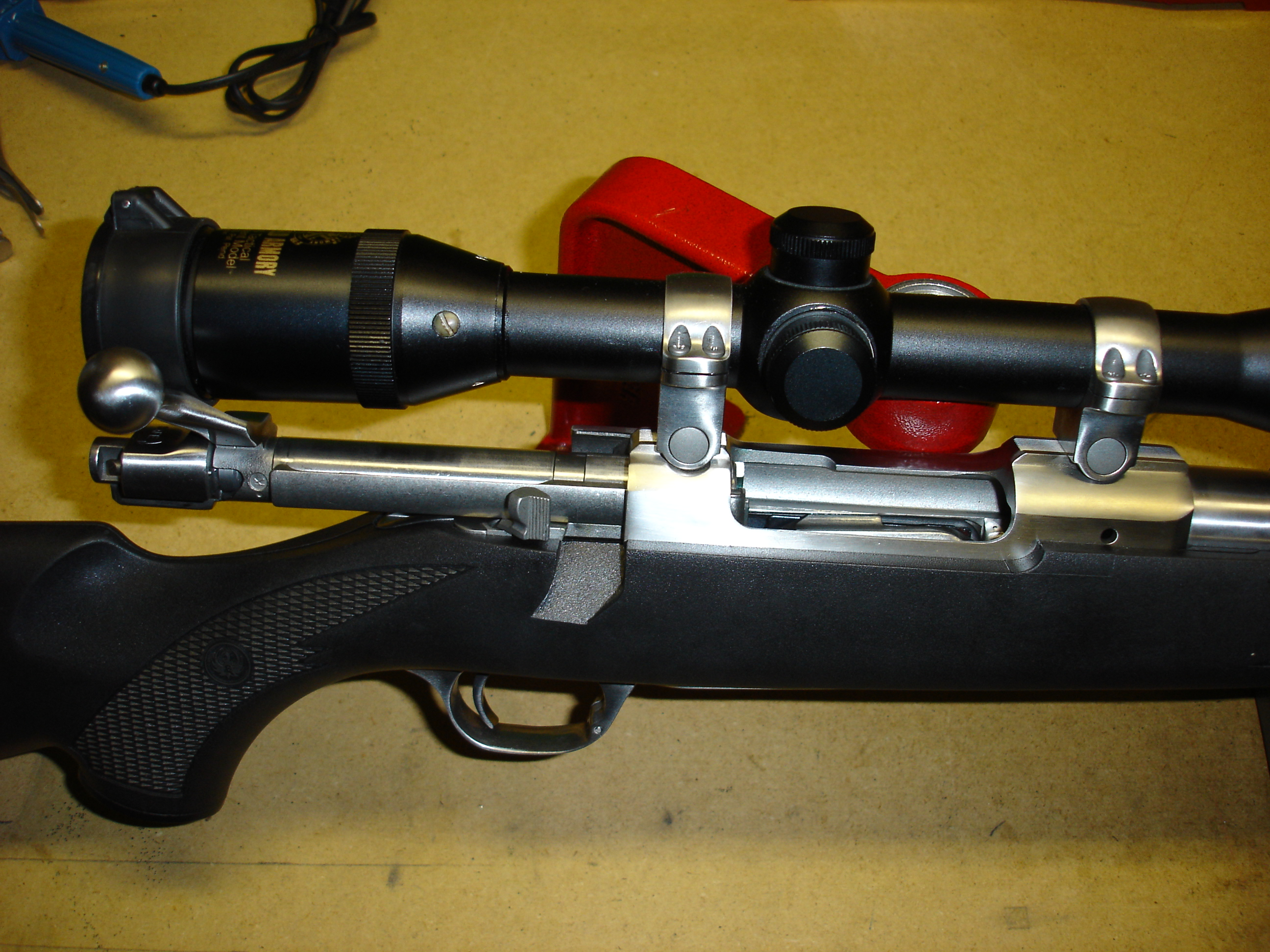
Ruger M77 Mark II Stainless Bolt Action in .204

- Hawkeye
- Ruger Scout Rifle (discontinued) replaced by the American Rifle Generation II Scout rifle
- 77-Series
- Ruger American Rifle (discontinued) replaced by the American Rifle Generation II
- Ruger American Rimfire
- Ruger Precision Rifle
- Ruger Precision Rimfire
- Ruger American Rifle Generation II

==== Autoloading rifles ====
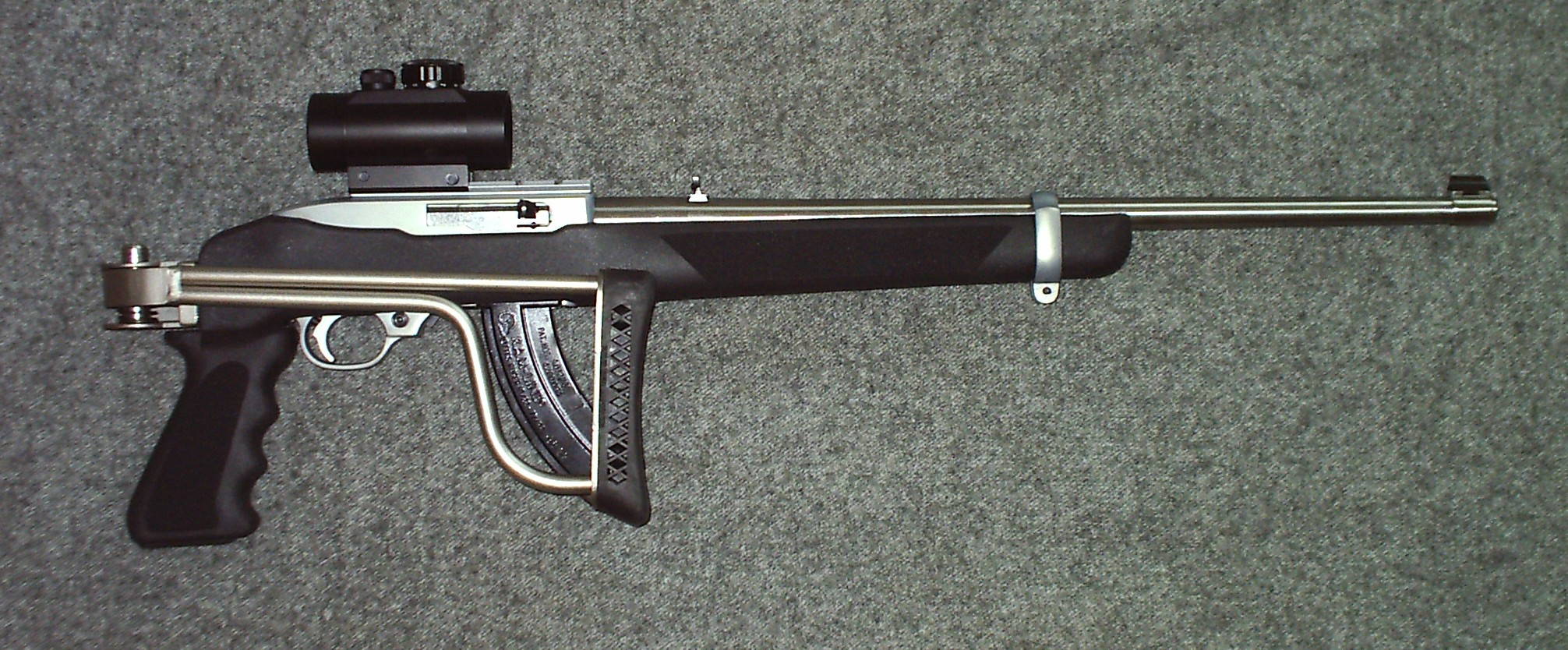
Ruger 10/22 "Stainless" With an aftermarket Butler Creek Folding Stock and a TRUGLO Red Dot Sight

- 10/22
- Mini-14
- Mini Thirty
- SFAR (discontinued)
- PC carbine
- LC carbine
- Harrier
- AR-556 (discontinued)
- SR-556 (discontinued)
- SR-762 (discontinued)
- Deerfield carbine (discontinued)
- XGI (not produced: development halted)
- Police carbine (discontinued)
- Model 44 (discontinued)
- 10/17 (discontinued)

==== Lever-action rifles ====
- Model 96 (96/44, 96/22 and 96/17 discontinued)

==== Single-shot rifles ====
- No. 1
- No. 3 (discontinued)

=== Shotguns ===
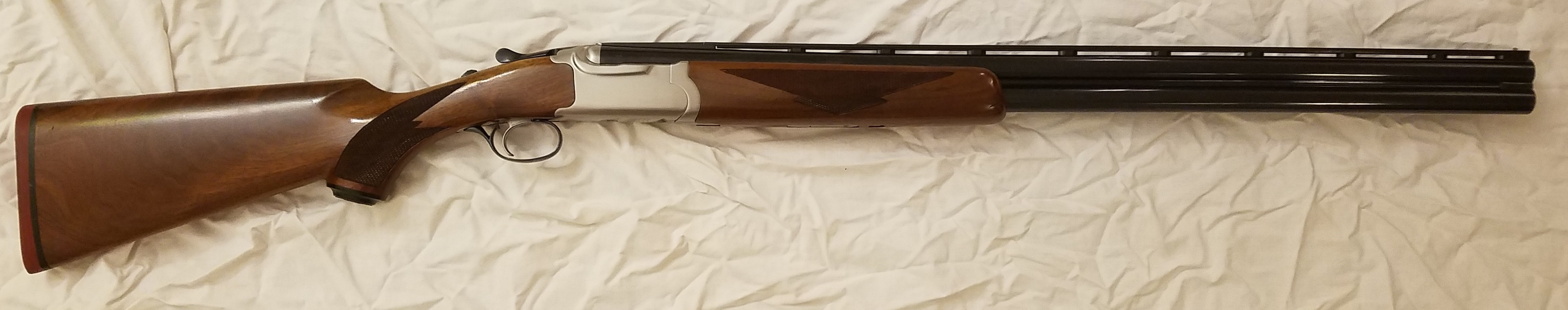
Red Label shotgun

- Gold Label (discontinued)
- Red Label (discontinued)
- Ruger Red Label III

=== Submachine guns (discontinued) ===
- MP9 (discontinued)

=== Handguns ===
==== Centerfire pistols ====
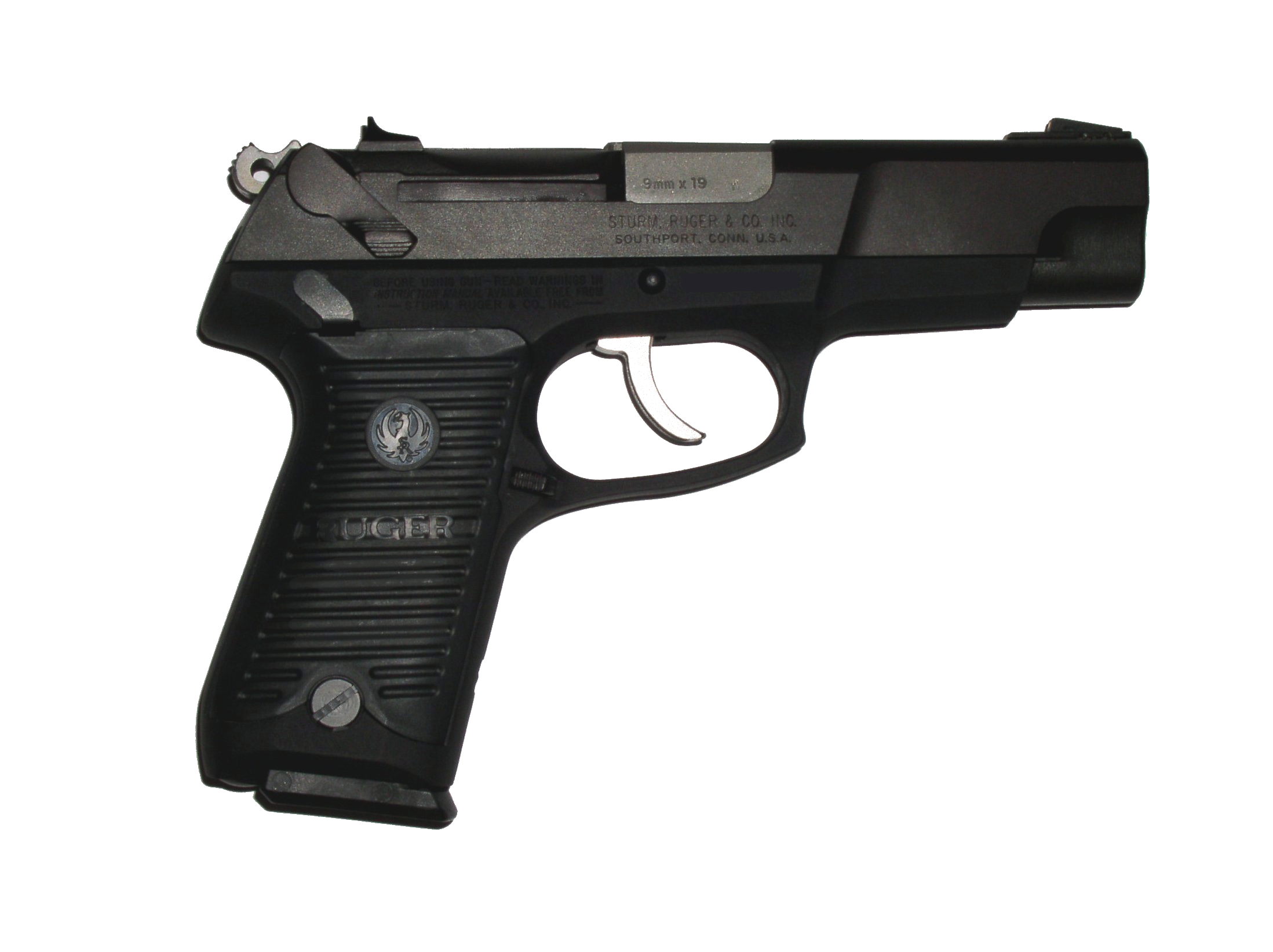
Ruger P89

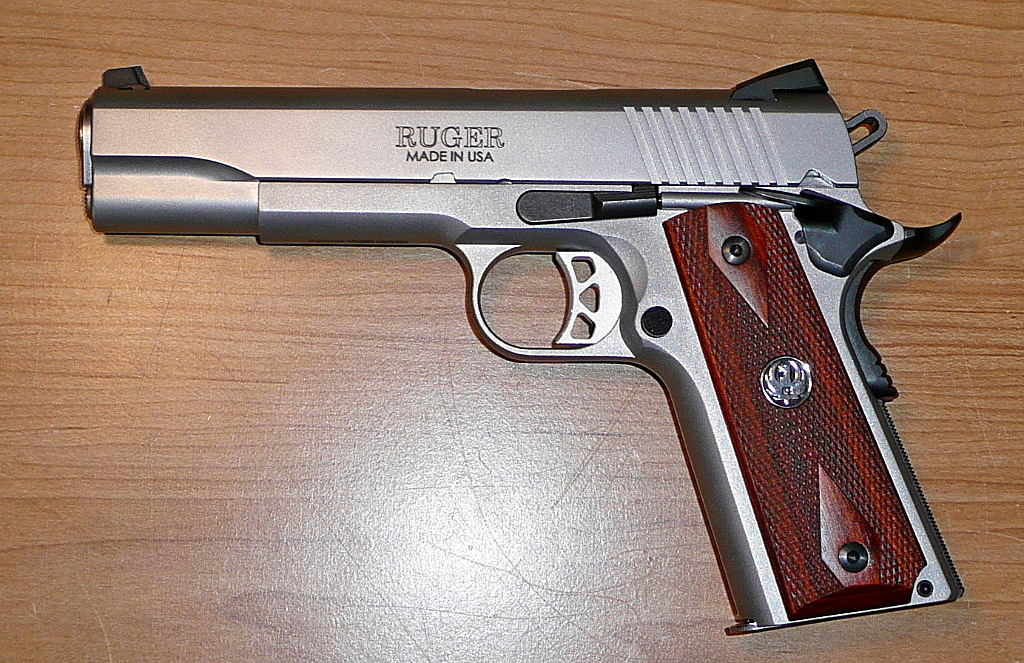
Ruger SR1911 (.45 ACP)

- Ruger American Pistol
- Security-9
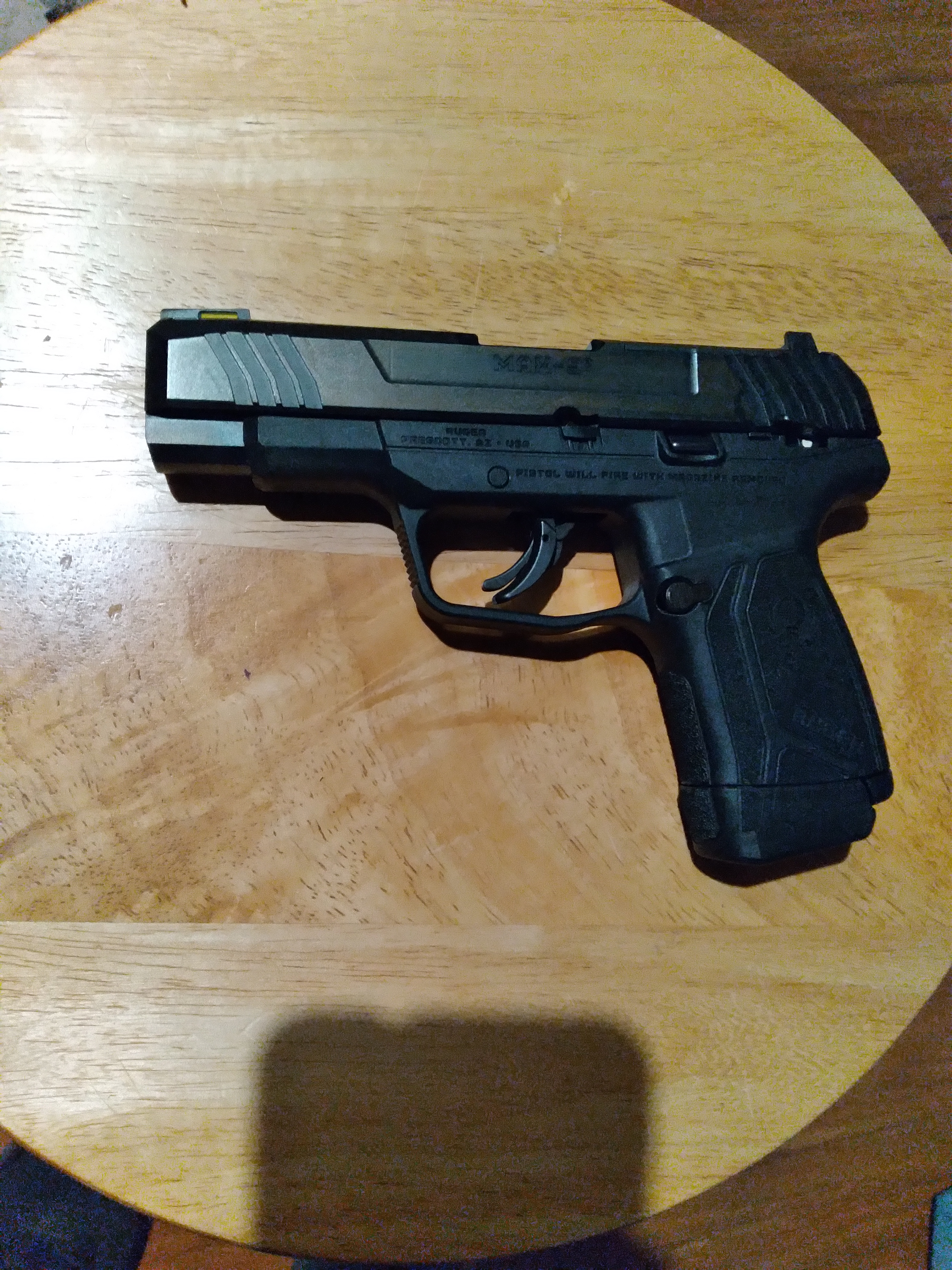
- Ruger Max-9 (9mm Luger)
  Ruger MAX-9
- EC9s
- SR1911
- LCP II
- LCP Max
- LC380
- Ruger-5.7
- Security-380
- PC Charger
- LC Charger
- LCP II in .380 auto (discontinued)
- LC9 (discontinued)
- LC9s (discontinued)
- Hawkeye (discontinued)
- P-Series (discontinued)
- SR-Series (discontinued)
- Ruger RXM (based on the 3rd generation Glock G19)

==== Rimfire pistols ====
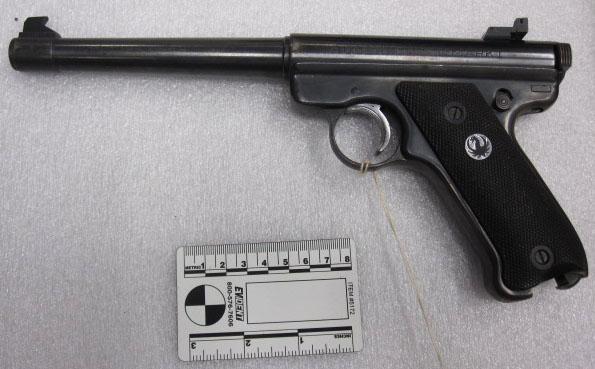
Ruger MK I

- Mark IV
- LCP II in .22 LR
- 22 Charger (discontinued)
- SR22 (discontinued)
- Standard (MK I) (discontinued)
- MK II (discontinued)
- MK III / 22/45 (discontinued)

==== Double-action revolvers ====
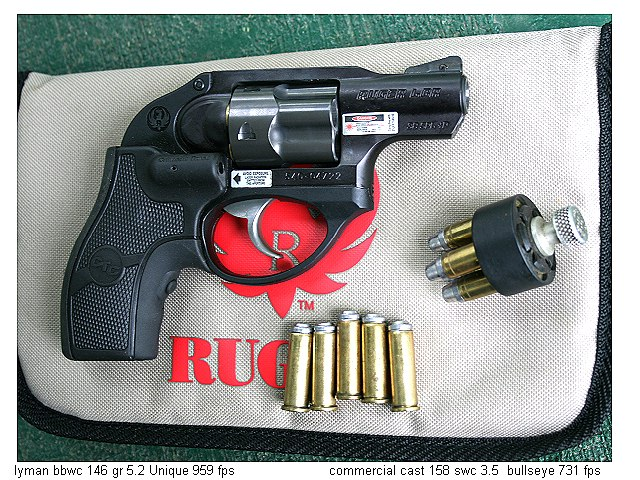
The first variation of the Ruger LCR .38 Special with laser grips

- SP101
- GP100
- Redhawk
- Super Redhawk
- Super Redhawk Alaskan
- LCR
- Security-Six/Service-Six/Speed-Six (discontinued)

==== Single-action revolvers ====
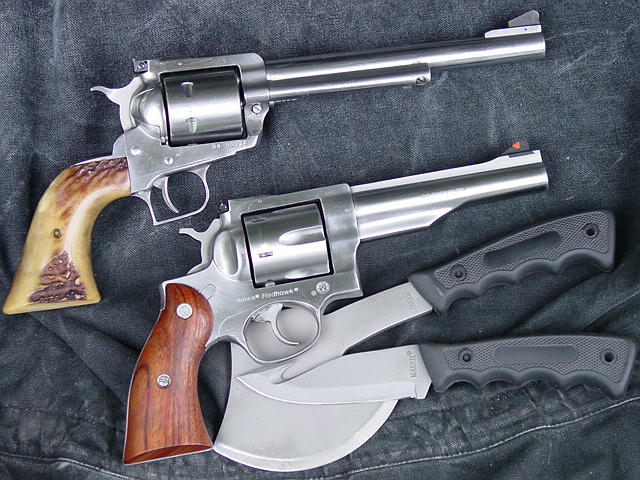
Stainless New Model Super Blackhawk and Redhawk

- Bearcat
- New Model Single-Six
- New Model Blackhawk
- New Model Super Blackhawk
- Ruger Vaquero
- Wrangler
- Super Wrangler
- Old Army (discontinued)

== See also ==
- List of modern armament manufacturers

== Bibliography ==
- Wilson, R. L. (1996). Ruger & His Guns: A History of the Man, the Company and Their Firearms. ISBN 0-7858-2103-1.
