= Ruger American Pistol =

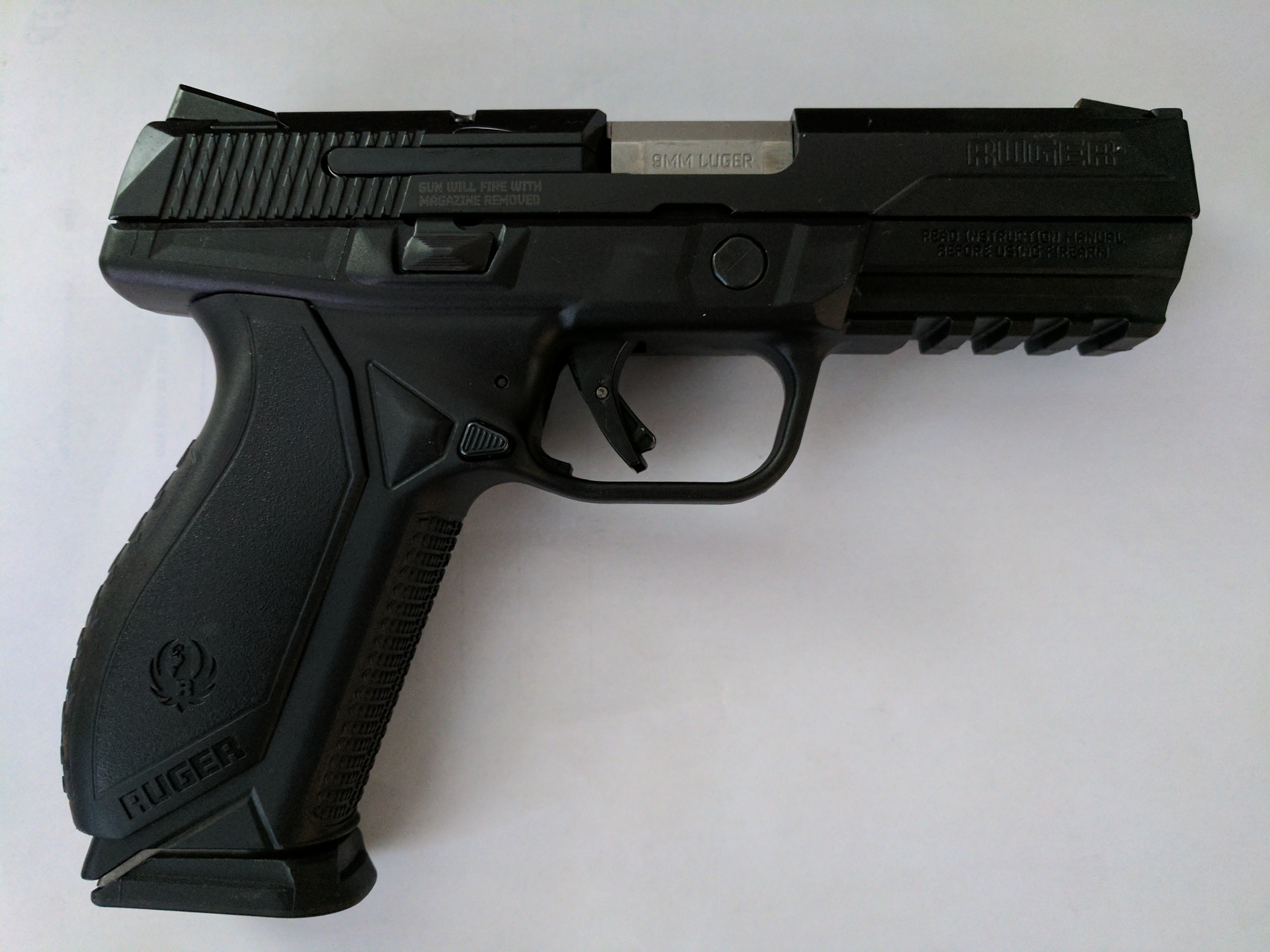
- Type: Semi-automatic pistol
- Place of origin: United States

Production history
- Manufacturer: Sturm, Ruger & Co.
- Unit cost: $579 (MSRP)
- Produced: 2015–present
- Variants: Compact and Full size pro model and External Thumb safety version.

Specifications
- Cartridge: 9mm Luger; .45 ACP
- Action: Short recoil
- Rate of fire: semi-automatic
- Feed system: 17-round or 10-round magazines and 12-round or 10-round magazines for compact pistols (9mm); 10-round magazine (.45 ACP)

The Ruger American Pistol is a polymer-framed, semi-automatic pistol introduced by Ruger in December 2015.

== Design ==
The pistol uses a pre-tensioned striker firing system and is chambered in 9mm Luger and .45 ACP. It employs a Browning-type locked-breech short recoil action, with a barrel cam system designed to reduce felt recoil. The serialized component is a steel chassis, fitted into a glass-filled nylon frame. The frame includes a Picatinny rail for mounting accessories.

== Variants ==
In September 2016, Ruger announced compact versions of the pistol, also chambered in 9mm Luger and .45 ACP.

In March 2020, Ruger introduced the American Pistol Competition, chambered in 9mm, and the American Pistol Compact with a gray Cerakote finish, chambered in .45 ACP.
