= Angel Rifles =

- Traded as: G.B. Rifles Pty. Ltd
- Industry: Retail
- Founded: 1980; 46 years ago in Gosford, New South Wales, Australia
- Founders: Bill Angel
- Headquarters: Gosford, Australia
- Key people: Geoff Ayling, Andrew Powell

The Angel M80 Rifle is a 7.62×51mm single shot target rifle designed and made in New South Wales in Australia by Bill Angel in the 1980s. The Angel action was one of the first solid cylindrical type target actions (described as 'rigid massive') made in that country. It followed the success of the Swing design in the UK which saw the move away from 'open' designs; often derived from 19th Century military actions. It was approved for use in Australia on 1 November 1980.

The Angel was the first action available in Australia which was strong enough to support a floating barrel.

The design emphasis was on creating an action where distorting effects were minimized. The action was cylindrical with a small side loading port. Recoil was borne through a slot cut in the six o'clock position halfway along the action. A piece of tool steel was bedded in the stock and mated into the slot to form the recoil lug. It was claimed at the time that this feature resulted in less distortion of the action during firing and prolonged the life of the bedding. The position of the bedding screws, close together and near the trigger, was similarly claimed to minimise distortion in the action.

Locking was achieved by a solid bolt head and three bolt lugs. The bolt head was designed to be removable thus allowing the owner to vary the head space by replacing the head. The bolt head is of the floating type whereby it is a loose fit in the bolt tube and held in place by a pin, the firing pin passing through a hole in that pin. This allows the locking lugs to self centre with even pressure when the action is locked.

Although of similar appearance to the Sportco (Omark) Model 44 there are no interchangeable parts with the Angel. The Omark has the same style three lug removable bolt head but the orientation of the hole for the pin that attaches the head to the bolt body is at a different angle as is the extractor. The locking lugs for the Angel are a part the action whereas the Omark has the lugs as part of the barrel.

Bill Angel (Production Manager) formed a partnership with Geoff Ayling (General Manager) and Andrew Powell (Marketing Manager) to manufacture and market the rifle under the name G.B. Rifles Pty. Ltd. It had a manufacturing facility at Gosford in New South Wales.

The Angel was marketed as a more affordable local equivalent to the Swing rifles being developed in the UK. At the time these rifles were stated to cost $800 – $1,500 AUD whilst the Angel was available either as an action on its own at $180 AUD or as a complete rifle for $450 AUD. The complete rifle was initially made available with a Schultz & Larsen blued chromoly steel barrel, 26 inches long with a 1 in 13 twist chambered for the 7.62×51mm NATO (308 WIN) cartridge. Other types were made available at the purchaser's request.

501 Angel actions were made. The majority of Angel rifles were right-handed although approximately twelve left-handed actions are understood to have been made. A model known as a Hawk Angel was made specifically for benchrest shooting.

Approximately the first one hundred actions made were half an inch longer than later versions at the rear of the action. The change to a shortened action was made due to the rear sight hitting shooters when placed fully to the rear and the overhang behind the trigger causing issues with stock geometry.

right-handed Angel rifles were serial numbered starting with AA and then three digits. Left handed models had serial numbers commencing with an LH prefix and the Hawk Angel had a prefix of HA.

Angel made their own triggers.

All actions were fitted with a rear mount for a Central target sight.

The original Angel stock was of a yellow coloured wood with a rounded fore end that was parallel all the way to the tip with a basic cheek piece with no adjustment.

The rifle is no longer in production.

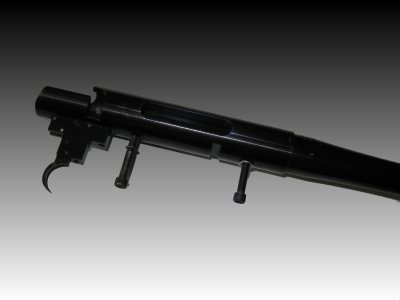
The underside of an Angel M80 receiver.

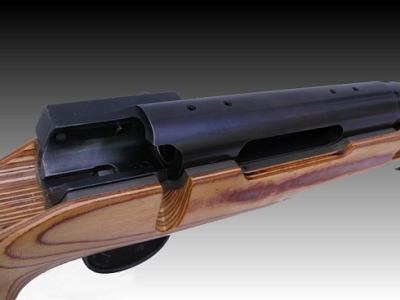
The right hand side of an Angel M80 receiver.

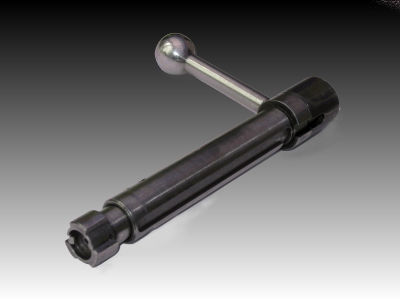
An Angel M80 bolt (not original handle).

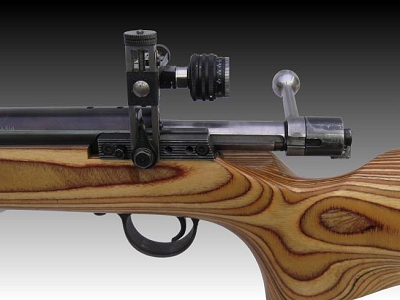
The left hand side on an Angel M80 showing a Central Mk 4 sight. Woodwork is not original.

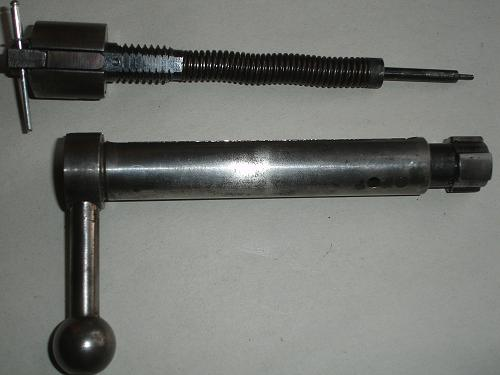
The Angel M80 bolt disassembled.

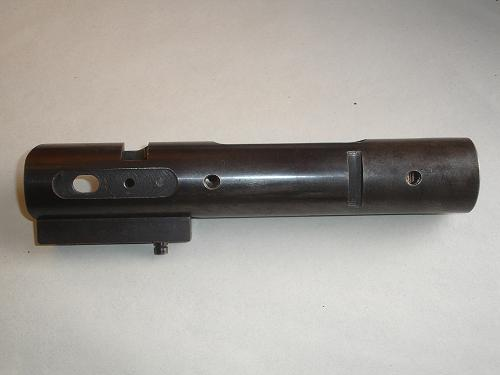
A bottom view of the Angel M80 receiver without trigger fitted.

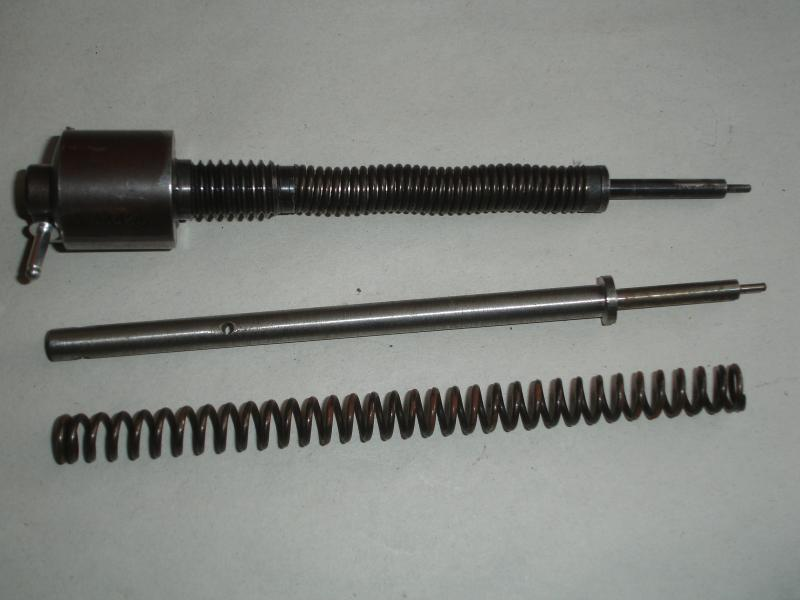
The Angel M80 firing pin assembly.

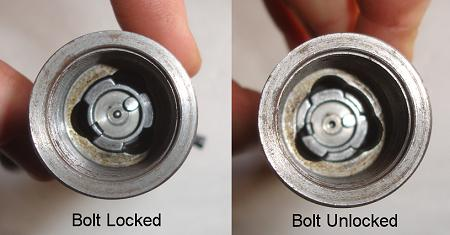
The Angel M80 locking mechanism.

Media related to Angel Rifles at Wikimedia Commons
