= .310 Cadet =

Rifle cartridge

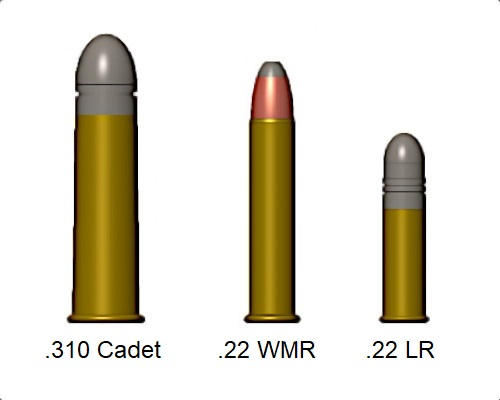
- Type: Rifle
- Place of origin: United Kingdom

Production history
- Designer: W.W. Greener
- Designed: 1900
- Manufacturer: Westley Richards and others

Specifications
- Case type: Rimmed, Straight
- Bullet diameter: .323 in (8.2 mm)
- Neck diameter: .327 in (8.3 mm)
- Base diameter: .355 in (9.0 mm)
- Rim diameter: .410 in (10.4 mm)
- Rim thickness: .043 in (1.1 mm)
- Case length: 1.12 in (28 mm)
- Overall length: 1.6 in (41 mm)
- Rifling twist: 20"
- Primer type: Small rifle

Ballistic performance
Bullet mass/type	Velocity	Energy
110 gr (7 g) SP	1,500 ft/s (460 m/s)	550 ft⋅lbf (750 J)
120 gr (8 g) SP	1,530 ft/s (470 m/s)	624 ft⋅lbf (846 J)
- Source: "Cartridges of the World"

The .310 Cadet, also known as the .310 Greener, or the .310 Martini, is a centerfire rifle cartridge, introduced in 1900 by W.W. Greener as a target round for the Martini Cadet rifle. Firing a 120 grain heeled lead projectile at 1350 ft/s the round is similar in performance to the .32-20 Winchester and some rifles may chamber both rounds with some accuracy. The full metal jacketed round was used in cadet rifles in Australia and New Zealand after early 20th-century Defence Acts. In New Zealand, after the start of the Boer War, a cadet corps had been started; by 1901 it was recommended that membership be compulsory. 500 Westley-Richards miniature Martini–Henry rifles were available by October 1902 (Auckland Star), and 5000 by April 1903 (Star). Such rifles gained popularity in Australia, New Zealand and the United States when thousands of Martini Cadet rifles were sold by the Australian government after World War II. A shorter version used as a humane killer was used in pistols. Known as the .310 cattle killer, invented by WW Greener, it was shorter in that a .310 cadet could not be accidentally chambered into the humane killer pistol.

== Current Use ==
After being sold by the Australian government many were converted to sporting or target rifles, often re-barreled to calibers like .22 Hornet, .218 Bee, .25-20 Winchester, .222 Rimmed, .357 Magnum and others to .22 rimfire by gun makers like Sportco.

Those still using the .310 Cadet have to either buy cases to reload, by Bertram Bullet Co. in Victoria, Australia, or several small independent ammunition makers in Australia and the United Kingdom. However these new .310 Cadet cases are 3-4 times as expensive as new .32-20 Winchester cases, hence shooters modify .32-20 cases, as a cheaper alternative. Modifications involve length resizing, and in most cases reducing the rim thickness. Due to the .310 using a heeled projectile, the neck thickness of the .32-20 does not have to be reamed down, after first being case length resized to 1.075" (27.3 mm). Most .310 cadet chambered rifles need to have the rim of the .32-20 case reduced from 0.065" to 0.045" (1.7 mm to 1.14 mm), to allow proper head spacing and operation of rifle. However, in the unusual instance of a lever action .32-20 fitted with a .310 barrel, the rifle will cycle better without the case rim thickness being reduced. As home reloading is the main option for the .310, many shooters play with different case length reduction of the .32-20, anywhere from 0.875'' to 1.185'' (22.23 mm to 30.10 mm).

== Dimensions ==
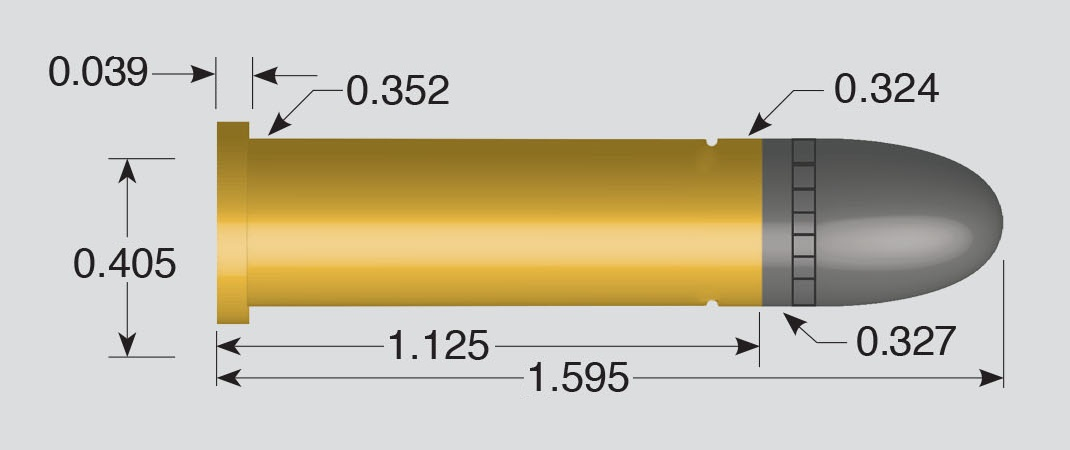

== Gallery ==
.310 Cadet samples
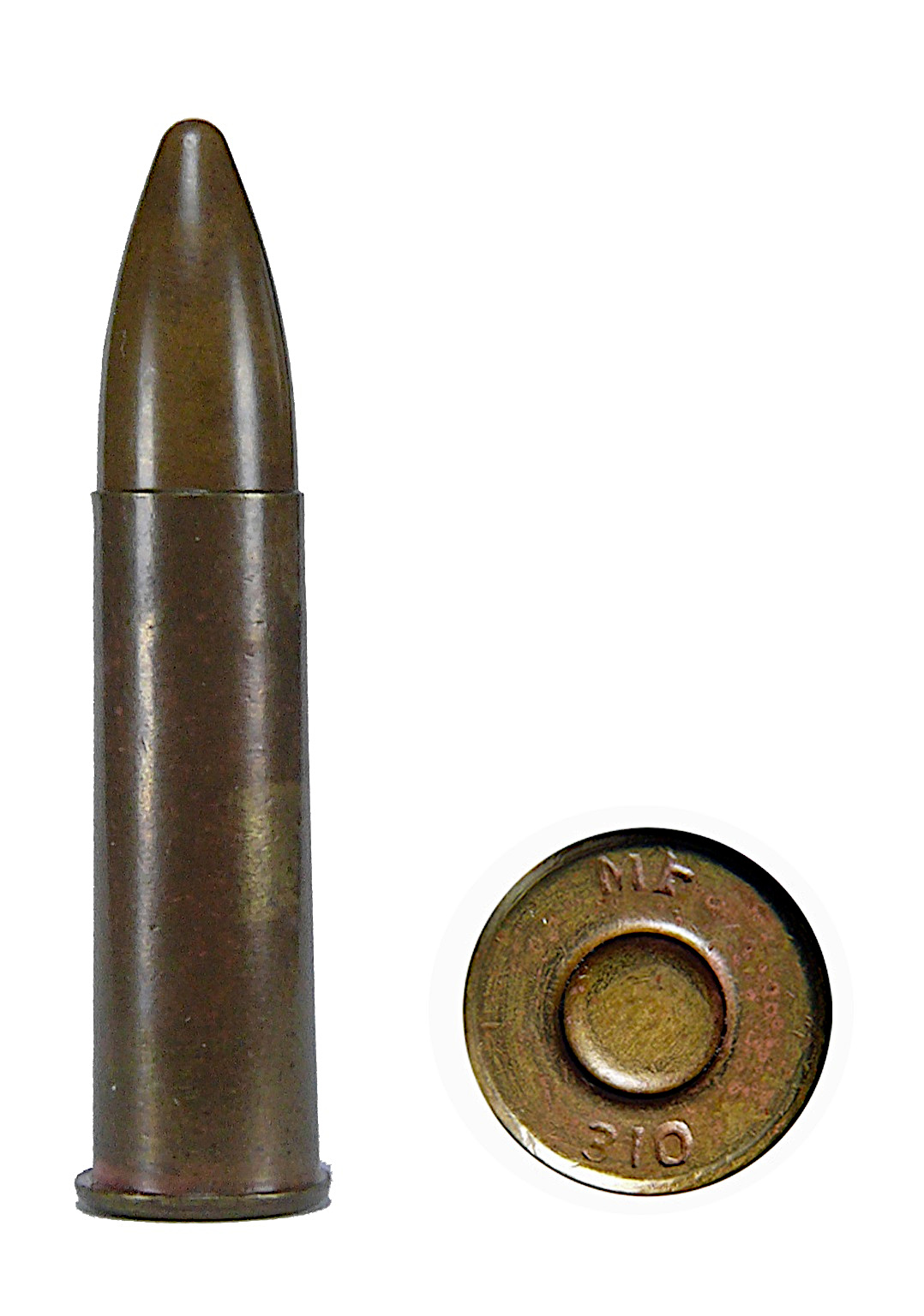
An Australian .310 Cadet FMJ.

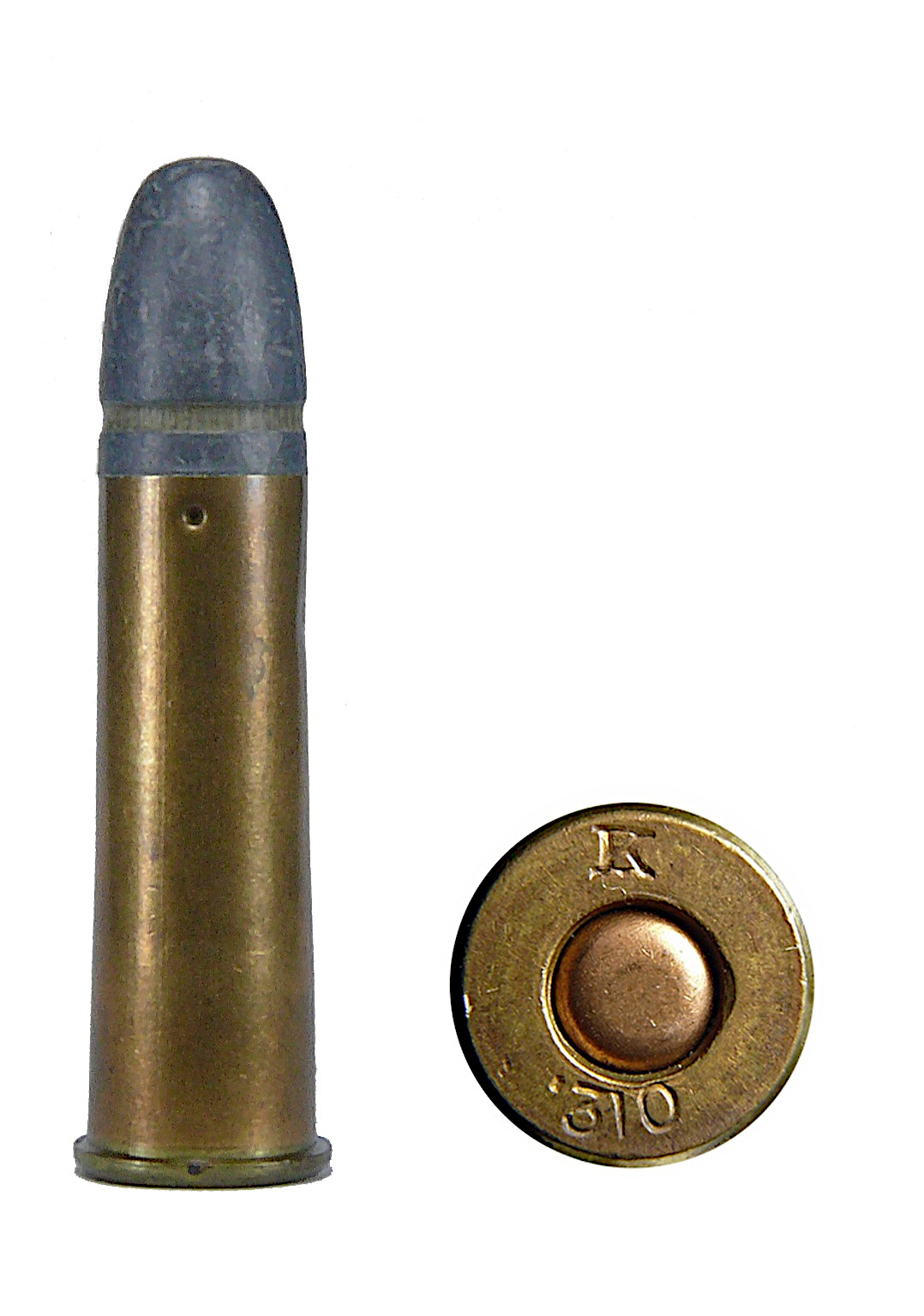
A British .310 Cadet lead bullet.

== See also ==
- .32-20 Winchester
- Martini Cadet
- List of rifle cartridges
