= Martini Cadet =

Martini-Cadet
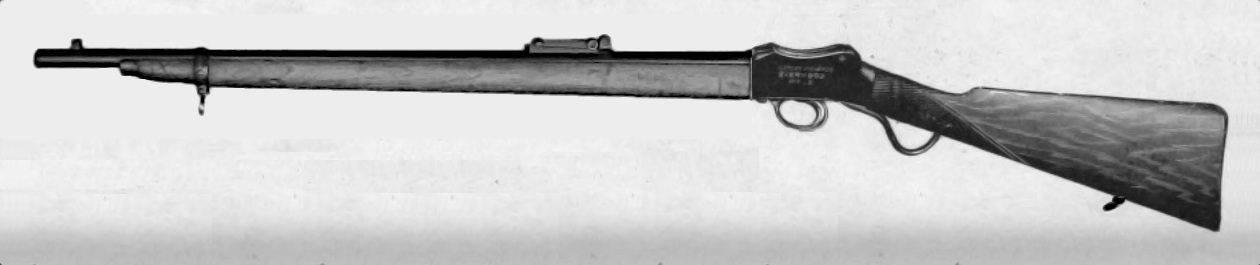
- Type: Cadet training rifle
- Place of origin: United Kingdom

Service history
- In service: 1891-1955
- Used by: United Kingdom & Australia

Production history
- Designer: RSAF Enfield
- Designed: 1891
- Manufacturer: BSA and W.W. Greener
- Produced: 1891-c.1949
- No. built: approx. 83,000-

Specifications
- Mass: 6 lb 5 oz (unloaded)
- Length: 42in (1250mm)
- Cartridge: .310 Cadet
- Calibre: .310 Cadet
- Action: Martini Falling Block/Francotte action
- Rate of fire: 10 rounds/minute
- Muzzle velocity: 1,200 ft/s (370 m/s)
- Effective firing range: 300 yd (270 m)
- Feed system: Single shot
- Sights: Sliding ramp rear sights, Fixed-post front sights

The Martini Cadet is a centrefire single-shot cadet rifle produced in the United Kingdom by BSA and W.W. Greener for the use of Australian military Cadets. Although considered a miniature version of the Martini–Henry, the internal mechanism was redesigned by Auguste Francotte to permit removal from the receiver as a single unit. Chambered for the .310 Cadet cartridge (aka: .310 Greener), it was used from 1891 to 1955. They were also sold to the public thereafter, as the BSA No.4, 4a, 4b and 5 in other calibres like the .297/230 and .22 rimfire. The rifles will often chamber the similarly sized .32-20 Winchester and fire with some accuracy. However the 32/20 is actually 0.312 cal and the 310 is 0.323 cal. Due to this 10 thousandths difference the accuracy of a .32/20 round cannot be guaranteed.

After being sold by the Australian government many were converted to sporting or target rifles, often re-barrelled to calibres like .22 Hornet, .218 Bee, .25-20 Winchester, .222 Rimmed, .357 Magnum and others to .22 rimfire by gun makers like Sportco.

== See also ==
- British military rifles
- Martini–Henry
- Martini–Enfield
- Sporterising
