= Marlin Model 1894 =

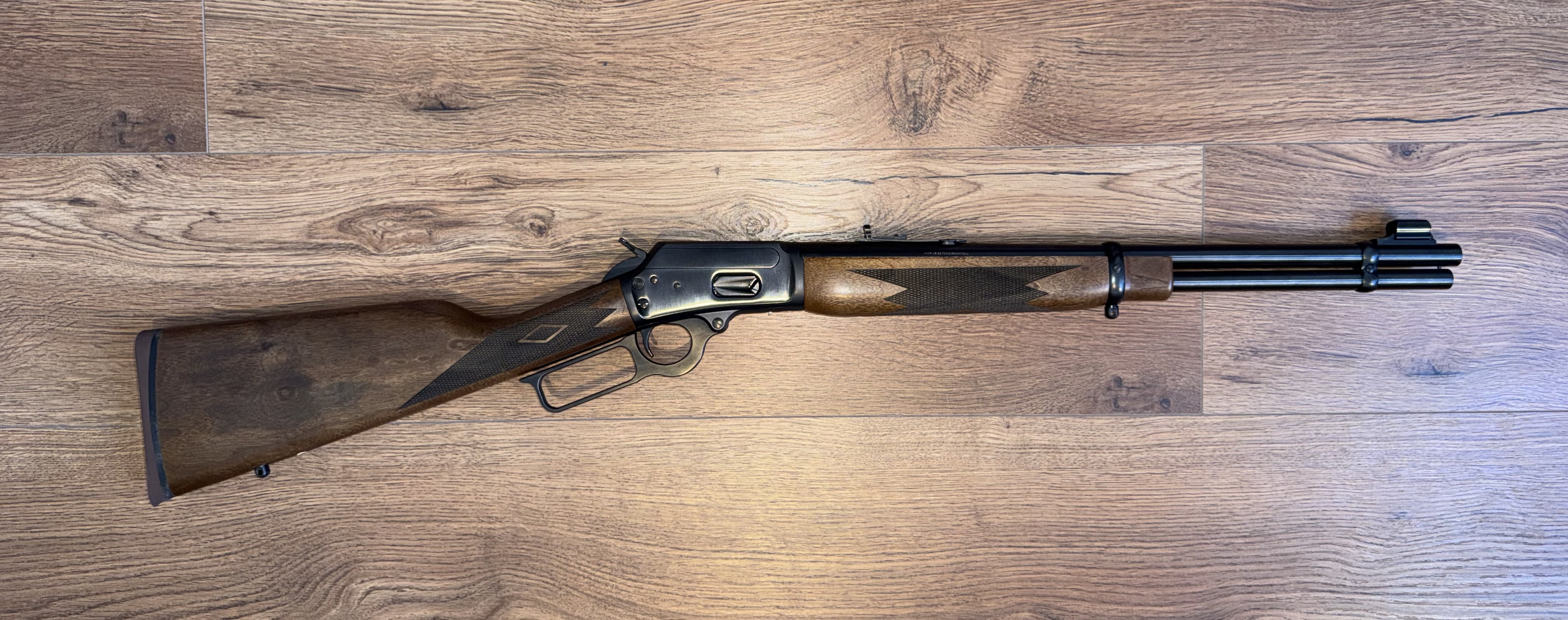
- A Marlin Model 1894 in .357 Magnum
- Type: Lever-action rifle
- Place of origin: United States

Production history
- Designer: John Mahlon Marlin
- Designed: 1894
- Manufacturer: Marlin Firearms
- Produced: 1894–present

Specifications
- Mass: 6 lbs (2.72 kg); 6.5 lbs (2.95 kg)
- Length: 36 in (914 mm); 37.5 in (952 mm); 39.5 in (1003 mm)
- Barrel length: 16.25 in (413 mm); 18.5 in (470 mm); 20 in (508 mm); 22 in (559 mm)
- Cartridge: .218 Bee; .22 Magnum; .25-20 Winchester; .32-20 Winchester; .32 H&R Magnum; .38 Special; .357 Magnum; .41 Magnum; .44-40 Winchester; .44 Special; .44 Magnum; .45 Colt
- Action: Lever action
- Feed system: 6-, 9-, or 10-shot tubular magazine
- Sights: Adjustable rear, ramped front

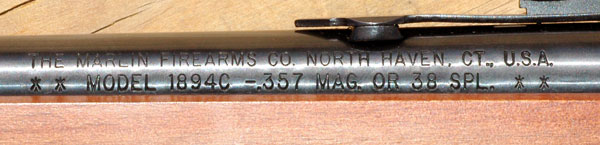
Marlin 1894C rollmark

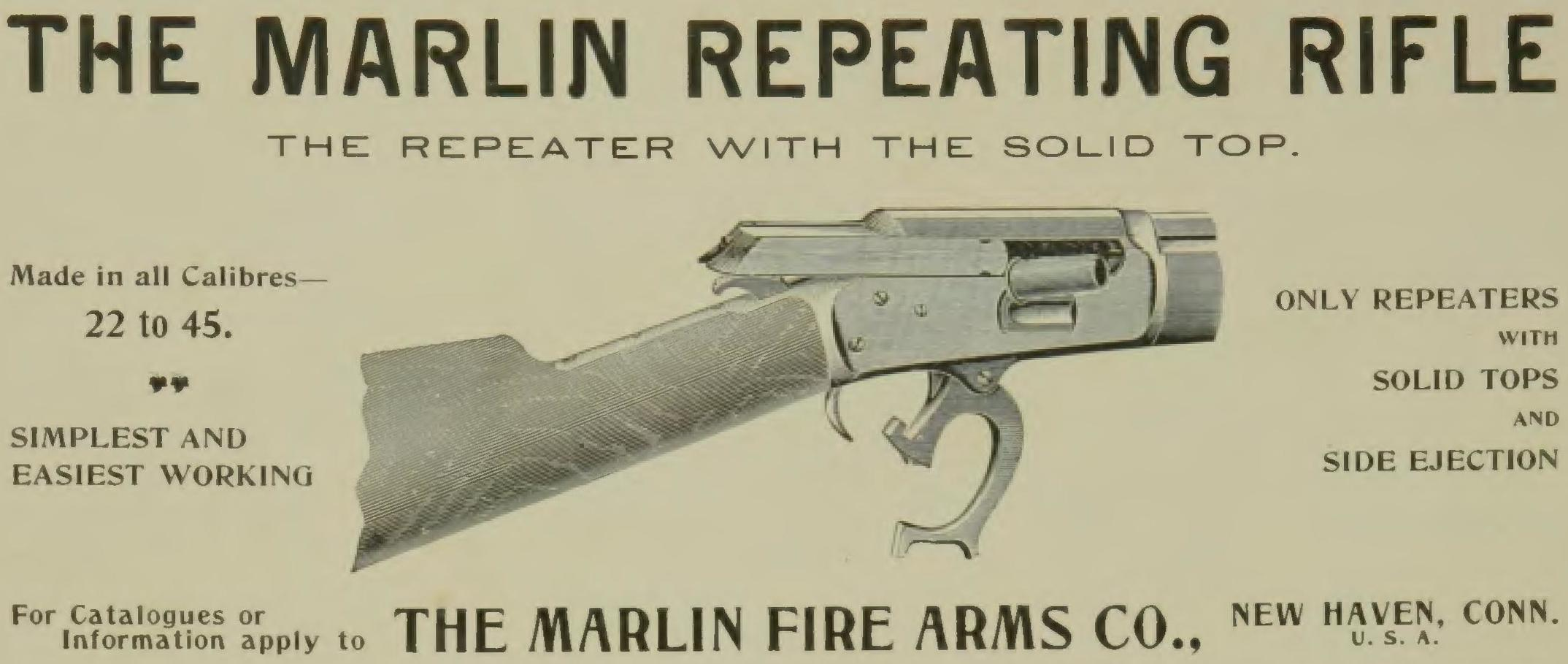
"The Marlin Repeating Rifle" ad detail, Virginia Tech Bugle 1897

The Marlin Model 1894 is a lever-action repeating rifle introduced in 1894 by the Marlin Firearms Company of North Haven, Connecticut. At its introduction the rifle came with a 24-inch barrel and was chambered for a variety of rounds such as .25-20 Winchester, .32-20 Winchester, .38-40, and .44-40. Variants in other chamberings remain in production today.

Even though both are lever-action rifles and named similarly, the Marlin 1894 is different from the Winchester Model 1894.

== History ==
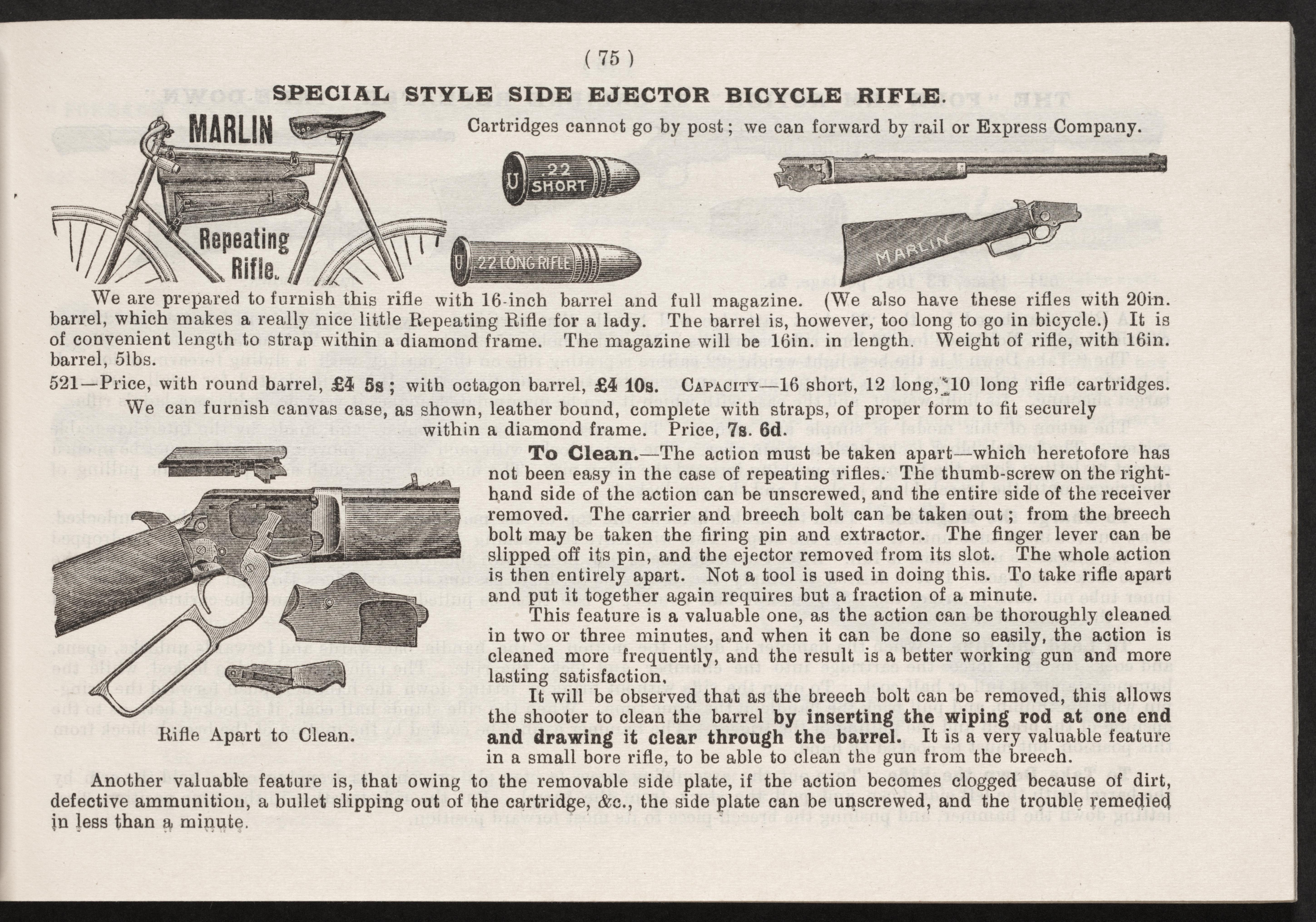
Special style side ejector bicycle rifle (1902)

Marlin produced its first lever-action repeating rifle as the Model 1881, a strong but heavy design that could accept powerful large-caliber black powder cartridges similar to those used in single-shot designs used for buffalo, bear, and other big game hunting.

This was followed by the Model 1888 which was a top-eject action like the 1881 with several improvements, most important was the incorporation of a locking lug locking the breech. It was chambered in the WCF (Winchester centerfire) family of cartridges originally developed for the Winchester 1873 rifle: .44 WCF, .38 WCF, and .32 WCF (also known as the .44/40, .38/40, and .32/20).

The designer and patentee of the Model 1888 and subsequent Marlin lever action rifles (including the Model 1894) up to the Model 1897 was L.L. Hepburn (Lewis Hepburn), a Marlin firearms engineer. The Marlin Model 1889 was the very first lever-action repeater to incorporate a flat solid steel top receiver with side ejection of spent cartridge cases. Marlin's design team believed that a solid-top steel receiver would be safer in the event of a hang-fire cartridge, and stronger than a top-eject frame of equivalent weight. The Model 1889 was chambered for the same cartridges as the 1888. Internal upgrades included a locking lug and firing pin system that prevented discharge until the bolt was locked in place. The new model also utilized a cartridge carrier that raised automatically, closing the end of the magazine after the head of the cartridge had passed into the carrier, thus preventing the next cartridge from entering the carrier and jamming the action.

The Marlin 1894 was originally patented on August 1, 1893 by L.L. Hepburn. With this design, Marlin simplified and strengthened the internal lever-action mechanism while continuing the practice of using a flat solid steel top receiver with side ejection. With the Model 1894, Marlin removed the rear-locking lug, which extended down into the trigger guard and had a tendency to pinch the shooter's fingers during rapid-fire cycling. Other design improvements over the Model 1889 included a one-piece trigger and a two-piece firing pin to prevent the rifle from firing unless the finger lever was fully closed or if the locking lug were missing. Additionally, the finger lever lock of the Model 1889 was eliminated on the Model 1894 and replaced by a latch built into the lever itself. This model was chambered in the same calibers with the addition of the .25/20 and later .218 Bee.

The Model 1894 and its successors found particular favor in Canada, Alaska, and the Pacific Northwest, where precipitation combined with cold temperatures sometimes caused top-eject designs to freeze solid. During the Klondike Gold Rush, the solid-top Marlin design was preferred by many prospectors facing subzero temperatures and dangerous animals, since the solid top frame was better at keeping freezing rain, snow and dirt out of the operating parts of the action.

With the popularity of magnum revolver cartridges in the 1960s, in 1969 Marlin produced a short-action Model 1894 that was designed for modern high-pressure .44 Magnum cartridges. Marlin had briefly manufactured its Model 336 chambered for the .44 magnum cartridge. However, after a few years of development Marlin reintroduced the model 1894.

In the 1970s, Marlin added the Model 1894C/CS in 1979 .357 Magnum, and released a version in .41 Magnum in 1984. In the mid-1990s, Marlin changed the .357 and .44 barrels from 12-groove-or-more "Micro-Groove" rifling to 6-groove "Ballard"-style rifling.

== Variants ==
The Model 1894 is produced in several variants, as shown in the table below. All variants are made in lever action, include a black walnut, straight grip stock, and except for the 1894CL, include adjustable semi-buckhorn folding rear and ramp front sights. The Model 1894CL features marble adjustable, semi-buckhorn rear and marble carbine front sights.

The Model 1894SS, caliber .44 Magnum, and the 1894CSS, caliber .357 Magnum are the only Model 1894s manufactured in stainless steel.

The Model 1894M (1983-1989), caliber .22 Magnum, no loading gate, magazine tube loading only. Approximately 12,000 made.

The Model 1894P (2000–2002), caliber .44 Magnum, and the 1894CP (2001–2002), caliber .357 Magnum both have 16 1/4 inch ported barrels.

The Model 1894CSBL (2011) caliber .357 Magnum, was to come in stainless with a big-loop finger lever, 16.25-inch barrel, pistol-grip laminated stock, and a one-piece XS scope mount with folding "ghost ring" aperture sight. However, shortly after announcing its release, Marlin suspended production indefinitely. It was finally released in 2018 along with the SBL variant chambered in .44 Magnum.

The Model 1894CB, in .32 H&R Magnum, loads from the front of the tubular magazine, like the Marlin Model 39A rimfire rifle, and has a faster, 10% shorter throw lever action.

There are also several "Limited Edition" Marlin 1894 rifles which are Stainless Steel with grey, laminated furniture and "tru-glo" sights. They were pre-drilled for a scope base and included a solid, rubber recoil pad. They are considered very collectible as only 250 of each caliber were made. There is a unique barrel stamping on these rifles which is denoted as Marlin 1894 LTDSS, followed by the caliber; example "Marlin 1894LTDSS 41 Magnum". These rifles were chambered in .357 Magnum/.38 Special, .41 Magnum/.41 Special, .44 Magnum/.44 Special, and .45 Long Colt.

There were a total of 2600, 1894s Rifles made in 1997 labeled as "The Marlin Limited" in .45 colt, .357 magnum and .44 magnum with 16.25" barrel.

Model	Caliber	Capacity	Barrel	Rifling	Twist rate	OAL	Weight
1894S	.41 Magnum.44 Magnum	10 rounds	20 in	12-groove Micro-Groove	1:38 in (right hand)	37½ in	6½ lbs
1894C	.357 Magnum.38 Special	9 rounds	18½ in	6-groove Ballard	1:16 in (right hand)	36 in	6 lbs
1894CP	.357 Magnum.38 Special	8 rounds	16 1/4 in	6-groove Ballard	1:16 in (right hand)	33 3/4 in	6 lbs
1894CSS	.357 Magnum.38 Special	9 rounds	18½ in	6-groove Ballard	1:16 in (right hand)	36 in	6 lbs
1894CST	.357 Magnum.38 Special	6 rounds	16 1/4 in (threaded)	6-groove Ballard	1:16 in (right hand)	35 in	6½ lbs
1894CSBL	.357 Magnum.38 Special	8 rounds	16 1/4 in	6-groove Ballard	1:16 in (right hand)	33 3/4 in	6 lbs
1894CL	.32-20 Winchester	6 rounds	22 in	6-groove Ballard	1:20 in (right hand)	39½ in	6 lbs
1894FG	.41 Magnum	10 rounds	20 in	12-groove Micro-Groove	1:20 in (right hand)	37½ in	6½ lbs
1894	.44 Magnum.44 Special	10 rounds	20 in	6-groove Ballard	1:38 in (right hand)	37½ in	6½ lbs
1894SS	.44 Magnum.44 Special	10 rounds	20 in	6-groove Ballard	1:38 in (right hand)	37½ in	6 lbs
1894P	.44 Magnum.44 Special	9 rounds	16 1/4 in	6-groove Ballard	1:38 in (right hand)	33 3/4 in	6½ lbs
1894CCL	.45 Colt.41 Magnum.32-20.44-40	10 rounds	20 in Octagon	6-groove Ballard	1:38 in (right hand)	37½ in	6½ lbs
1894CB	.32 H&R Magnum	10 rounds	20 in tapered octagonal	6-groove	1:16 in (right hand)	37½ in	6½ lbs
