= Sportco C11 =

C11
- Type: Target rifle
- Place of origin: Canada

Service history
- Used by: Canada

Production history
- Manufacturer: Sportco

Specifications
- Mass: 5.57 kg (12.3 lb) (with bipod and hand stop)
- Length: 120.33 cm (47.37 in)
- Cartridge: 5.56×45mm NATO
- Muzzle velocity: 991 m/s (3,250 ft/s)
- Feed system: Single shot, hand fed

The C11 rifle is a competition firearm used by members of the Royal Canadian Army Cadets for training and target shooting competition. It is based on the Sportco/Omark Model 44.

The C11 rifle is chambered in 5.56x45mm NATO, with a light palma profile barrel, it is a manually operated, bolt-action, hand-fed, single-shot, competition firearm. It has no applied safety and is fitted with an RPA Trakker rear sight, and an Anschutz 18mm tunnel foresight.

== See also ==
- RPA C12A1
