= Schultz & Larsen M52 target rifle =

M52, M58, M58E, M69 Schultz & Larsen Target Rifles
- Type: Target rifle
- Place of origin: Denmark

Service history
- In service: c. 1950–present

Production history
- Designer: Schultz & Larsen
- Designed: late 1940s
- Manufacturer: Schultz & Larsen
- Produced: 1950–1970s
- Variants: M52, M58, M58E, M69

Specifications
- Mass: 3.82 kg (8.4 lb)
- Length: 1,110 mm (43.70 in)
- Cartridge: .30-06; 6.5×55mm 7.62×51mm NATO
- Action: Mauser bolt action,
- Effective firing range: 600m depending on sights fitted
- Feed system: 5-round integral
- Sights: target aperture iron sights

The M52 was the first in a family of target rifles based on refurbished Mauser M 98 military actions by the Danish company Schultz & Larsen in the years following World War II. They were produced to fill a need for target rifles by the Danish shooting association - De Danske Skytteforeninger. The M52 was superseded by later variants (M58, M58E and M69) the last of which remained in production until the 1970s. It had a similar development path to other Scandinavian target rifles derived from German M98 and other Mauser actions, such as the Kongsberg M59 and Carl Gustaf M63.

== Search for a new target rifle ==
At the end of World War II the Danish shooting association faced a shortage of target rifles. The pre-war standard rifle, a variant of the Krag–Jørgensen in 8×58mmR Danish Krag, was complex to produce, obsolescent and it was not deemed practical to place it back in production. In any case, the .30-06 M1917 Enfield was the Danish Army's interim standard rifle, which would be soon replaced by the US M1 Garand, also in .30-06, and the Krag–Jørgensen action was not strong enough for the powerful US round. In a development path also followed concurrently by other Scandinavian countries, notably Norway with the Kongsberg M59, the Danes turned to the substantial quantity of Mauser 98 rifles left behind by the recently surrendered German forces. These were ideal in many respects. The action was much stronger than that of the Krag–Jørgensen, was suitable for the 6.5×55mm still favoured by Danish marksmen, and could handle the slightly longer .30-06 cartridge with some minor modifications. It was a strong action eminently suited for use in a target rifle and a target rear sight could be mounted on the receiver bridge. Most importantly, it was available in the numbers required.

A variety of different Mauser M 98 actions were represented. Although there was a large number of Kar98ks and some WW1 Gewehr 98s, many of the ex-German rifles were the Czechoslovak vz. 24, known in German service as the G24(t). Of superb quality, the Czech-made actions were almost identical to German-manufactured Kar98k actions, with the exception of markings and the use of a straight bolt handle projecting at right angles from the action. The German Kar98k bolt handle was turned down to bring it closer to the stock and the firer's hand, with a corresponding recess in the stock.

== Design details and conversion ==
To produce a M52, Schultz & Larsen stripped an ex-German rifle, checked the action and replaced the military 7.92×57mm barrel with its own heavy target barrel in either .30-06 or 6.5×55mm. In the case of the .30-06, the magazine was lengthened and the feed ramp re-profiled to suit. The trigger mechanism was honed for a better trigger pull. The metal parts were refinished, and the forend of the military stock was shortened and reamed out to accept the larger-diameter target barrel. The stock was then finely polished and target sling swivels installed. The steel Mauser buttplate remained. Both the foresight and aperture rearsight, and the sight picture they provided, were designed to be similar to the M1 Garand. The rearsight could be adjusted from 200 to 500 metres and was affixed to the receiver bridge with 2 screws. As it projected far enough forward to prevent loading with the standard 5-round Mauser clips, there was no need to cut a notch out of the rear of the receiver ring as done on the Kongsberg M59 to facilitate clip loading with the longer .30-06 round. However the 5-round magazine remained usable, and could still be loaded with single rounds.

== Variants ==
The broad range of variants is shown below. However, some examples might exhibit features from another variant, and many were modernised, for example the shortened military stock of an earlier model might have been replaced with a later target-style stock.

=== M58 ===
The operation and sight picture provided by the M52 sights were designed to be similar to those of the M1 Garand service rifle in order to ensure training commonality for reservists, but target shooting was growing more specialised, and some shooters were demanding a greater degree of adjustability. Accordingly, Schultz and Larsen introduced the M58, which was identical to the M52 except for the use of micrometer-adjustable Schultz and Larsen M24 target rearsight, and a tunnel-type target front sight with replaceable elements. It retained the use of the ex-military stock with the shortened forend. Various bolt handle configurations have been observed; the Kar98k turned down type was usually left as-is, but the straight vz. 24 handle was often partially turned down.

=== M58E ===
The M58E was produced for the British market, and so was available in 7.62×51mm NATO. It too was based on the refurbished Mauser military action, but was fitted with a new heavier target-style stock which was fitted with a broad forend and full curve pistol grip. The butt had a high comb, a cheekpiece and a rubber buttplate. The Schultz & Larsen target barrel was of heavier profile than preceding versions, and Parker or similar target sights were fitted, which put the eyepiece further to the rear than Danish versions. The new stock gave the rifle a family resemblance that was similar to other Scandinavian military target rifles such as the Carl Gustaf M63 and the Kongsberg M59, although without the top wood covering the barrel of the latter two rifles.

=== M69 ===
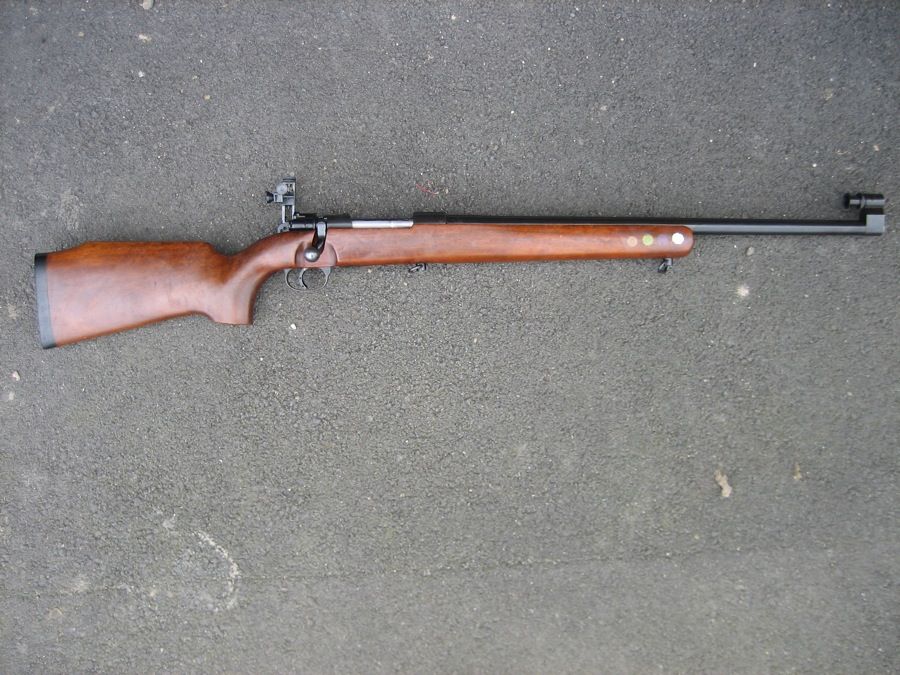
Schultz & Larsen M69 Target Rifle in 7.62×51mm NATO.

The M69 was of very similar appearance to the M58E and retained the refurbished Mauser military action, but with some detail differences amongst which the bolt handle was reshaped to a lower profile, fitting into a Kar98k-style recess in the stock on some examples. The receiver ring was scrubbed of its German markings and a new serial number (four digits with no letter suffix or prefix) was added on the right side above the stock line. The model designation on the left receiver wall (Gew.98 or Mod.98) was retained. The foresight block was sweated onto the barrel rather than attached to a dovetail. It was available chambered in 6.5×55mm Swedish Mauser and 7.62mm NATO. An excellent fully adjustable Schultz & Larsen match trigger replaced the polished military trigger used in earlier versions.

== Markings ==
Earlier versions retained the German receiver ring markings, but some rifles, especially later ones, had them removed and a new serial number was added to the right side of the receiver above the stock line. The left side of the receiver retained the original markings. Barrels had a calibre designation stamp near the breech and a SCHULTZ & LARSEN OTTERUP or GEVAERFABRIKEN OTTERUP (early examples) marking applied to the barrel. Bolts were usually re-numbered to match the receiver, but old numbers remained visible on some bolt parts, trigger guards and magazine floorplates.
