= Schultz & Larsen =

Danish firearms company

- Type: Private
- Industry: Firearm Manufacturing
- Founded: 1919; 107 years ago in Otterup, Denmark
- Founder: Hans Schultz
- Owner: Morten Krogh
- Website: schultzlarsen.com

Schultz & Larsen is a Danish rifle and silencer manufacturing company that was founded in 1919 in Otterup. In 1994 it was acquired by Jørgen Nielsen, and the production plants split between Otterup and Rask Mølle near Horsens. Currently the company is owned by Morten Krogh.

== History ==
The company was registered in January 1919 by Hans Schultz and his son-in-law Niels Larsen, and was later managed by Larsen's son Uffe Schultz Larsen. All three were Olympic shooters with Niels winning five medals in 1912–1924. Their fame as competitive shooters helped raise the popularity of their business – Schultz & Larsen rifles were traditionally known for their accuracy and were in high esteem among Danish marksmen.

The factory was an expansion of a gunsmith workshop. Schultz founded the workshop in 1904 and hired Niels Larsen in 1910. Following the Treaty of Versailles plenty of German machinery was sold abroad for scrap. Schultz and Larsen acquired a suitable set for manufacturing rifles and started producing small caliber target rifles. Later in the 1920s–30s the company also acted as an important subcontractor to Theodor Bergmann's German company, among other things they produced the MP35 submachine gun and the gun barrels to the MG 15 machine gun. In the mid-1930s Hermann Gerlich used the factory in his work on anti-tank projectiles, which was hampered in the Nazi Germany. Schultz & Larsen were relatively inactive during World War II, with the Nazi Germany controlling the factory and closing it in 1943. In those years the factory mostly repaired small arms and produced RPLT 42 carbines for the Danish coast guard; much of those weapons were stolen from the factory by the Danish resistance movement.

After the war the production focused on hunting rifles, and a range of target rifles based on the Mauser M 98, initially using components from Kar 98k rifles left behind in Denmark by German occupying forces. Schultz & Larsen also made target rifle conversions of captured Kar 98ks. Early versions, the M52 and M58, were made for service-style target shooting, and used shortened, polished and refurbished Kar 98k stocks combined with new heavy target-weight .30-06 or 6.5×55mm barrels as required. Later versions had new target stocks fitted and were available in .30-06, 6.5×55mm and 7.62×51mm NATO, and generally resemble the Norwegian Kongsberg Mauser M59, except there was no upper handguard or cleaning rod.

High-quality Schultz & Larsen barrels contributed to the development of the British Swing target rifle: "George Swenson had personally acquired the UK concession for Schultz & Larsen products, having known the brothers Larsen for some years. It was in fact the excellence of this firm's cut-rifled barrels, and their capability to extract maximum accuracy from sometimes very indifferent Radway Green government 7.62 NATO ammunition, largely due to the research carried out mainly by George and myself (not to mention help from Wally Middleton, then director of Radway Green) between 1968 and 1970, that helped launch the SWING model Sin 71 Rifle".

The Schultz & Larsen M5x series was followed by M60, M65, M68 and then by M84 and M100 rifles. They were highly praised among hunters and were sold out right after production. However, the production was manual and time-consuming, and hence unprofitable. In 1994 Jørgen Nielsen bought the factory and merged into his business. According to Jørgen Nielsen's website there is no longer any collaboration between Jørgen and Schultz & Larsen. Today the owner and CEO of the company is Morten Krogh.

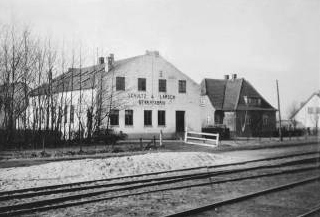
In April 1918 Schultz and Larsen bought the Emmelev Mølles barn and refurbished it for the Schultz & Larsen factory. In 1927 Niels Larsen moved with his family to the house seen next to the barn.

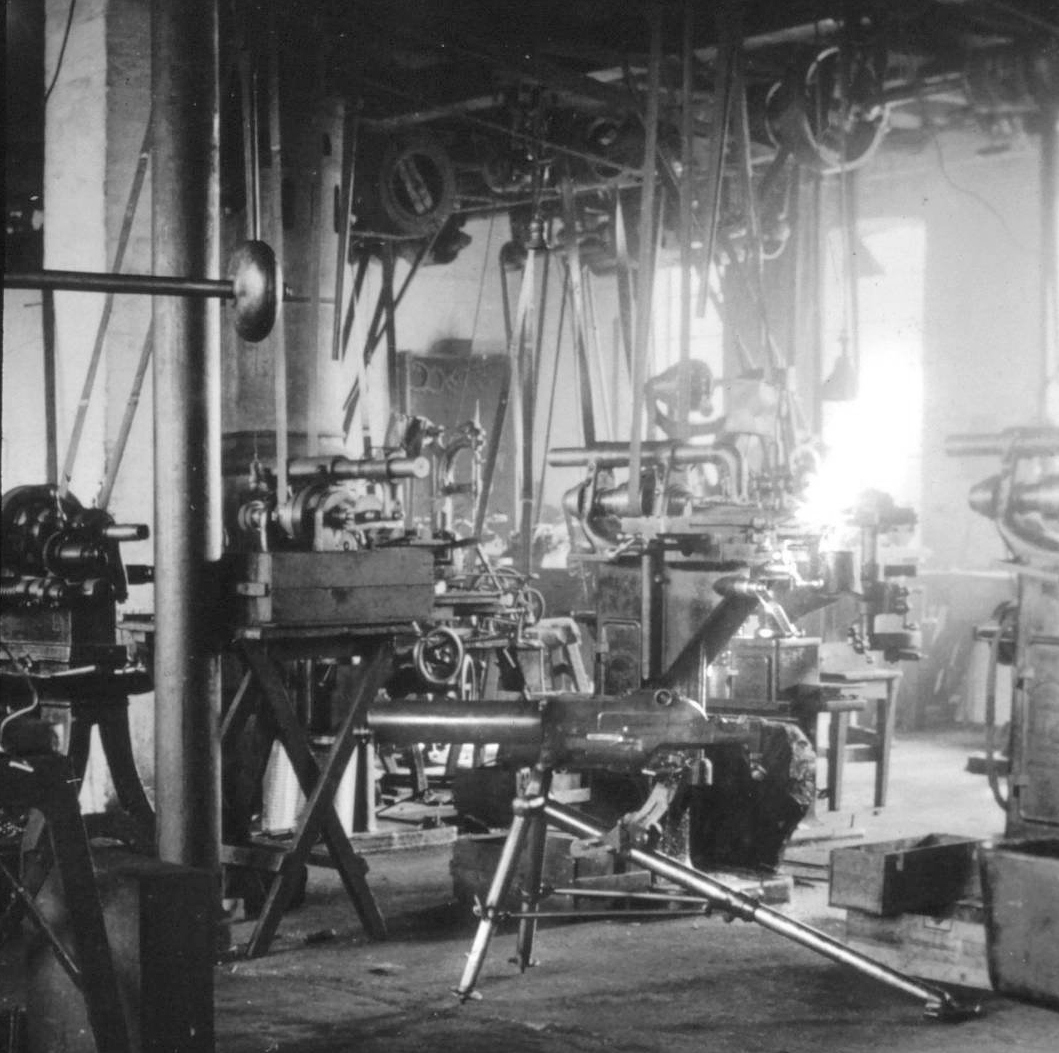
A Schwarzlose machine gun at the Schultz & Larsen factory in 1941.

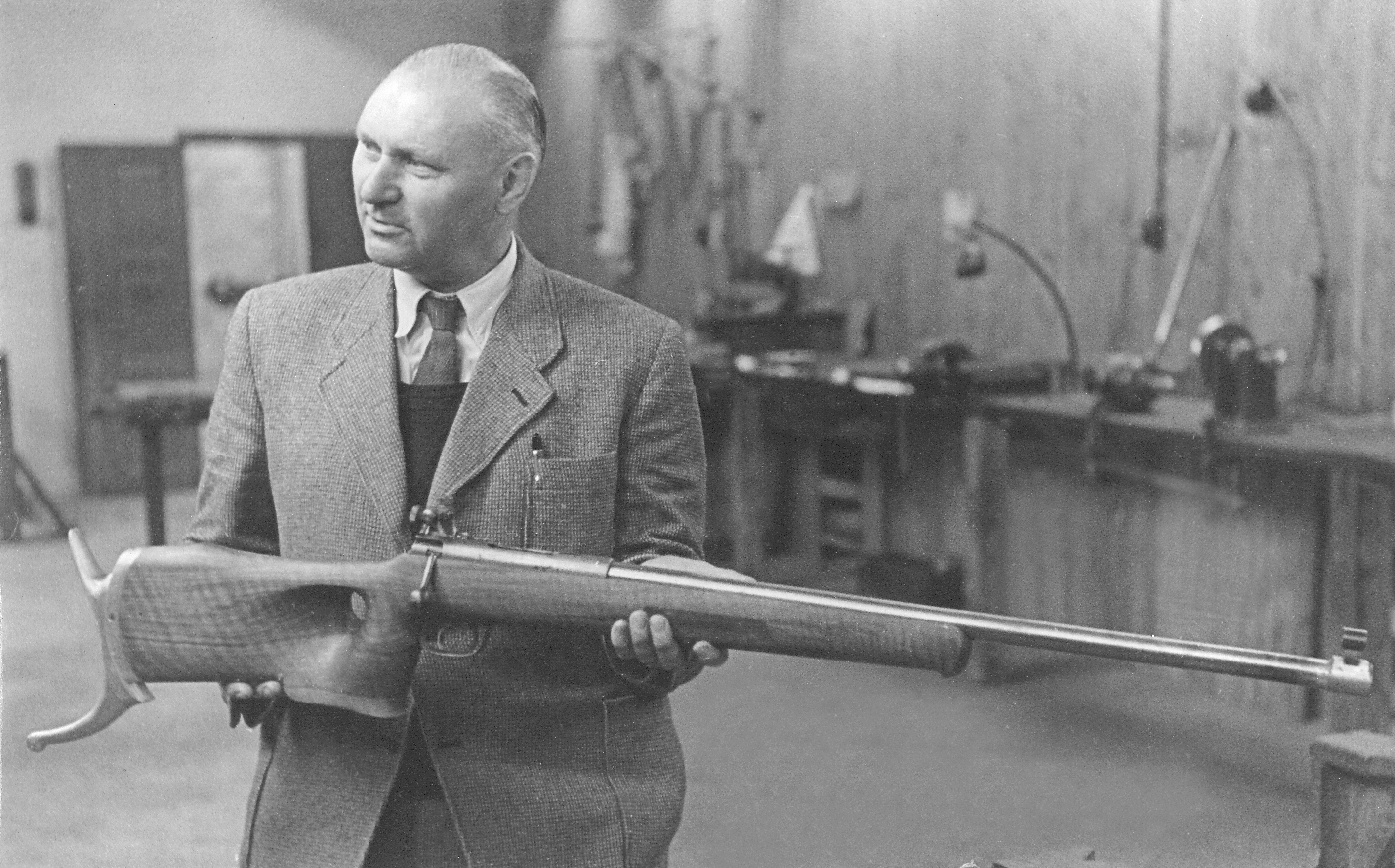
Niels Larsen with a Schultz & Larsen M48 rifle in 1945.

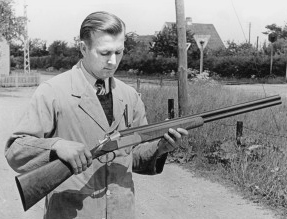
Uffe Schultz Larsens (1921–2005) with a shotgun outside a gun factory

== Models ==
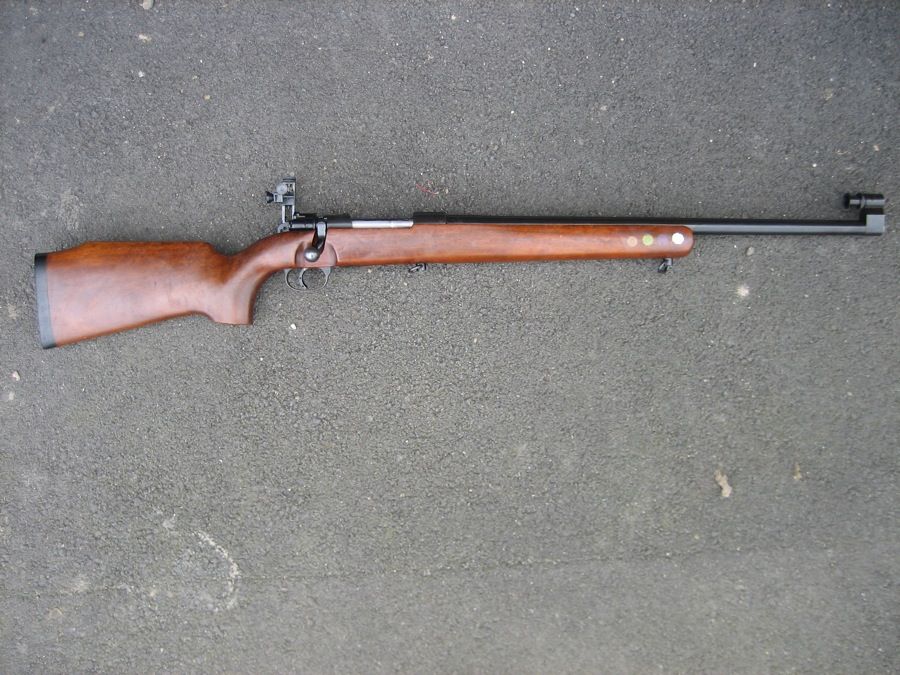
A photograph of the Danish Schultz & Larsen M69 Target Rifle in 7.62×51mm

Previous models

- RPLT 42
- M48
- M52, M58, M58E and M69
- M60
- M65
- M68
- M84
- M100

Current models

- Legacy
- Classic DL
- Traveller
- Ambassador
- Victory
- Tactical
