= Hans Schultz (sport shooter) =

Danish sports shooter (1864–1937)

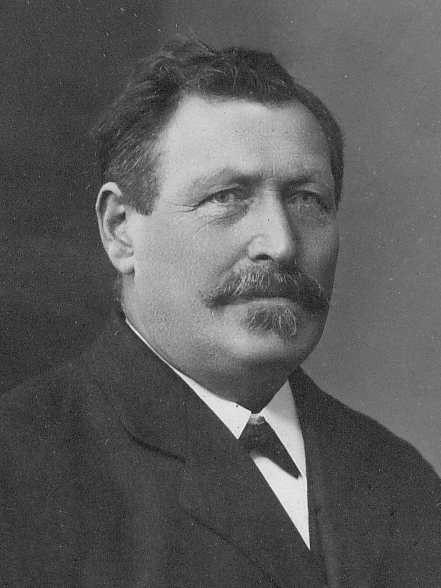

Personal information
- Born: 23 March 1864 Nordfyn, Syddanmark, Denmark
- Died: 26 June 1937 (aged 73) Nordfyn, Syddanmark, Denmark

Sport
- Sport: Sports shooting
- Event: Rifle
- Club: Otterup

Hans Christian Schultz (23 March 1864 – 26 June 1937) was a Danish sports shooter and founder of the Schultz & Larsen rifle company. He competed in six rifle events at the 1908 and 1912 Summer Olympics and finished fourth and eighth with the Danish team, respectively. His best individual result was a 21st place.

Schultz took up shooting in his teens and later served as a specialist in guns and ammunition with the Danish Army. By the time he moved to Otterup in 1889 he was already known as a gun expert, and frequently received rifles from other places for reparation and tuneup. In 1904 he founded a gunsmith workshop. In 1908 he learned about a talented young shooter, Niels Larsen, who dreamed of having a rifle from Schultz. Eventually Schultz hired Larsen in 1910. They competed together at the 1912 Olympics and became business partners in 1917. In January 1919 they opened Schultz & Larsen, a rifle manufacturing company based on the Schultz's workshop. Earlier in 1916 Larsen married Schultz's daughter Ellen; they had a son Uffe Schultz Larsen, who later competed in four Olympics and took over the company.
