= RPA Rangemaster =

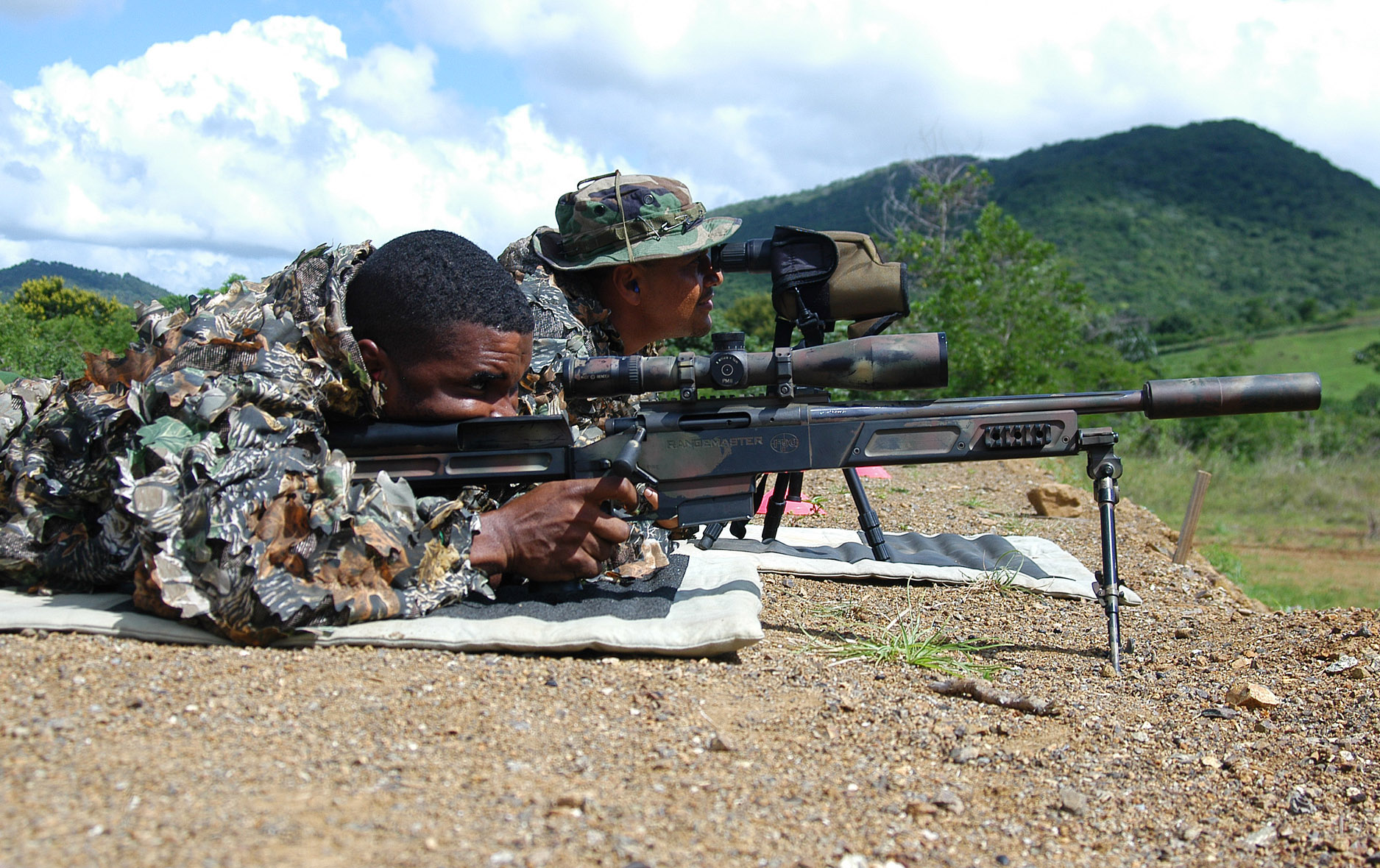
- A Trinidad and Tobago Sniper team firing an RPA Rangemaster 7.62 during three days of marksmanship events at Fuerzas Comando.
- Type: Anti-materiel rifle (Rangemaster .50); Sniper rifle (Rangemaster 7.62, Rangemaster 338)
- Place of origin: United Kingdom

Production history
- Manufacturer: RPA Defence
- Variants: Rangemaster 7.62mm, Rangemaster Standby 7.62mm, Rangemaster .338, Rangemaster .50, Rangemaster Ultra (.308 / 338 and .50)

Specifications
- Mass: w.bipod and scope (37.3 1bs)
- Length: 1520 / 1230 mm (60" / 48")
- Barrel length: 812 mm (32")
- Cartridge: 7.62×51mm NATO, .338 Lapua Magnum, 12.7 × 99mm NATO
- Action: Bolt-action
- Effective firing range: 200 m (219 yd) (7.62 Standby, subsonic), 1,000 m (1,094 yd) (7.62), 1,500 m (1,640 yd) (.338), 2,000 m (2,187 yd) (.50)
- Feed system: Detachable box magazine

The Rangemaster is a series of bolt-action rifles produced by the British company RPA International, formerly known as RPA Precision Ltd. Before the Rangemaster, the company had focused on target rifles, and entered the tactical rifle market in 2001 when they introduced their Rangemaster 7.62 rifle in 7.62×51mm NATO. Rangemaster soon subsequently developed other versions, with both the Rangemaster 338 in .338 Lapua Magnum and the subsonic short range Rangemaster 7.62 Standby in 7.62 NATO introduced in 2004, and the long range Rangemaster .50 anti-materiel rifle in 12.7 × 99mm NATO released the following year in 2005.

== Overview ==
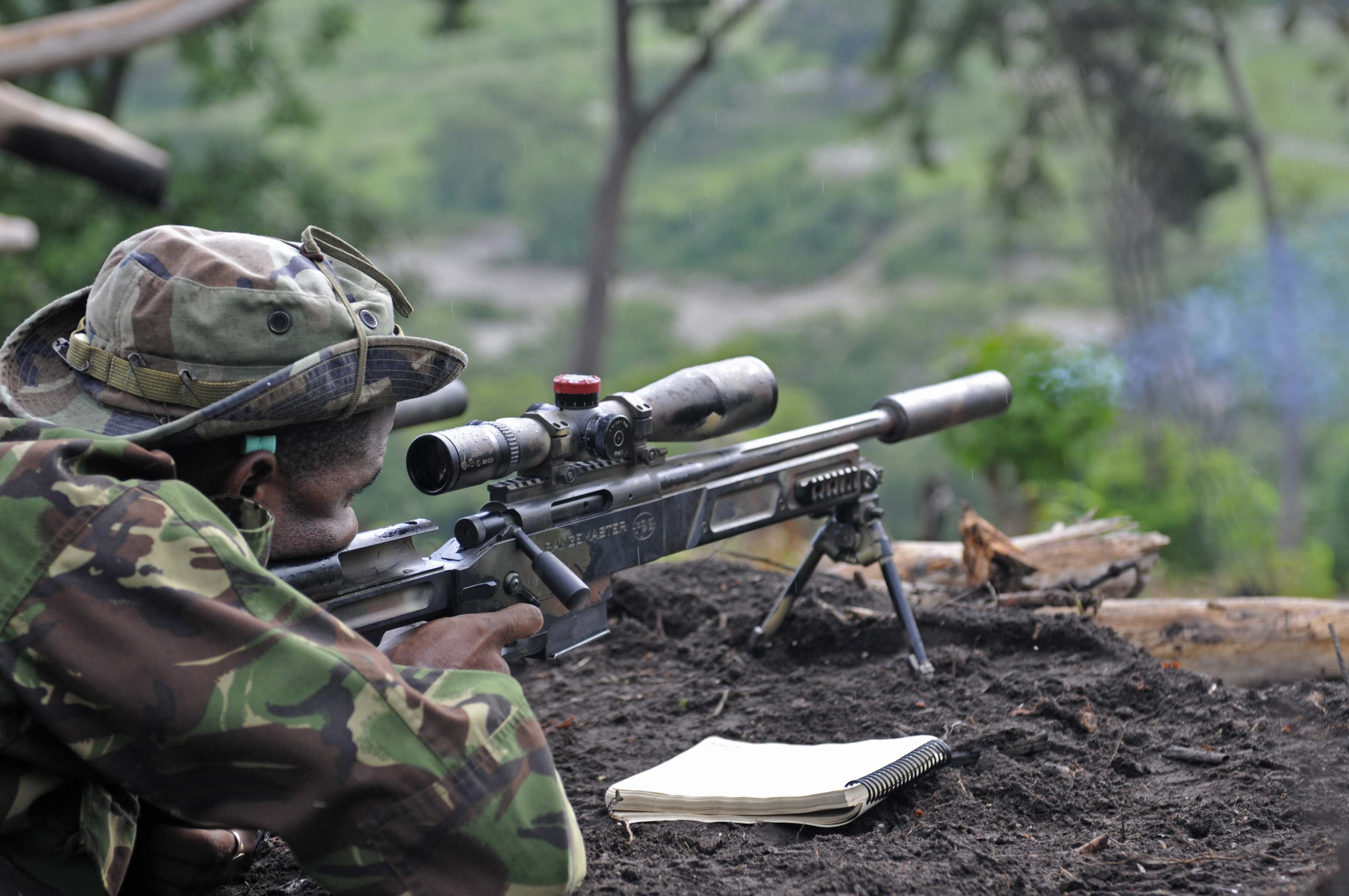
Brazilian sniper firing his RPA Rangemaster 7.62 rifle during the 2011 Fuerzas Comando" (Commando Forces) contest.

According to the company Rangemaster rifles are in active use with a substantial number of law enforcement personnel across the world and with appropriate ammunition are capable of performing constant sub-MOA accuracy (0.3 mrad).

== See also ==
- Accuracy International Arctic Warfare
- SIG Sauer SSG 3000
- C12A1, rifle based on the RPA Quadlock also produced by RPA International
