= RPA C12A1 =

C12A1
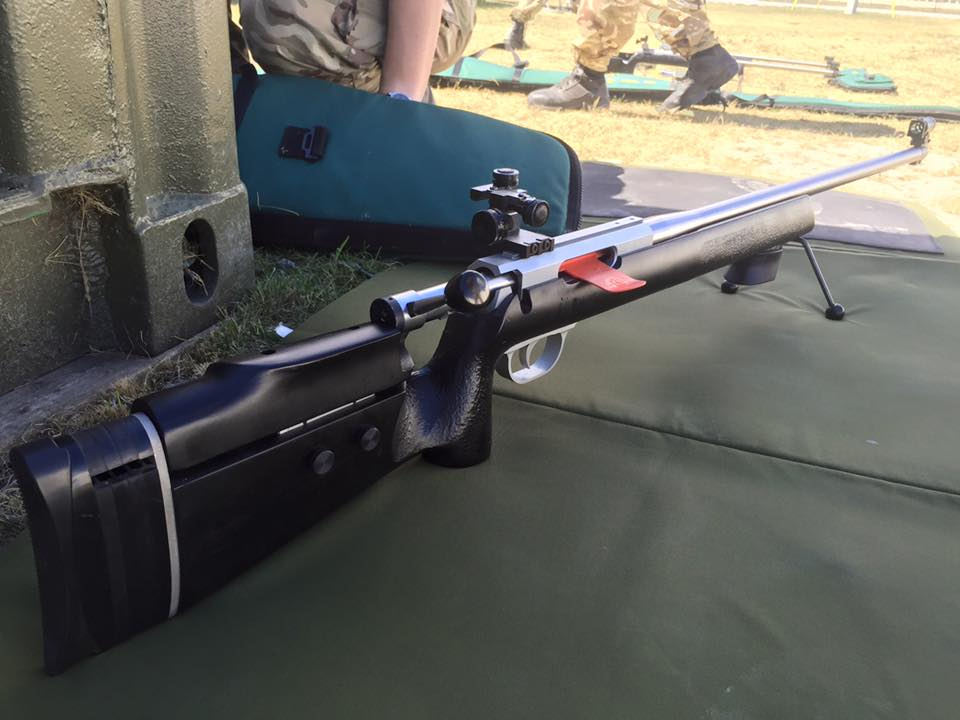
- Type: Target rifle
- Place of origin: United Kingdom

Service history
- Used by: Canada, United Kingdom

Production history
- Manufacturer: Rangemaster Precision Arms

Specifications
- Mass: 6.3 kg (13.9 lb)
- Length: 124.5 cm (49 in)
- Cartridge: 7.62×51mm NATO (.308 Winchester)
- Muzzle velocity: 832 m/s (2,730 ft/s)
- Feed system: Single shot, hand fed

The C12A1 cadet target rifle is a competition firearm used by members of the Royal Canadian Army Cadets for advanced training and target shooting competition.

The C12A1 cadet rifle is a single-shot, bolt-action rifle chambered in 7.62×51mm NATO. The C12A1 features the RPA Trakker rear sight, and an Anschütz front sight with level; it has no applied safety; it features a light palma profile free-floating barrel, and an ejector. The rifle was designed around the RPA Quadlock action. It is equipped with one of three versions of a synthetic Robertson pistol-grip stock with adjustable cheekpiece and buttplate. The first two stock versions are in black, with either a wider stock and one inch spacing between the cheek rest and butt plate (pictured), or with a thinner stock and no spacing; butt spacers may be inserted in both cases to adjust butt length as needed. The National Rifle Team (NRT) version of the rifle shows patterns of red and white with maple leafs as well the butt-stock length is adjustable on a screw rather than with spacers and is also able to have the angle adjusted (in addition to standard height adjustment). The C12A1 fires a 7.62×51mm NATO or .308 Winchester round.

The National Rifle Team, the British Cadet Rifle Team (BCRT), cadets participating in the Fullbore Phase 2 summer training course (formerly Cadet Leader Instructor Marksman Course), previously trained staff cadets, and members of adult staff who are Rifle Coaches use this rifle.

== See also ==
- Diemaco C11
- Royal Canadian Army Cadets
- RPA Rangemaster, another rifle also produced by RPA International
