= MP35 =

Blowback submachine gun used by Nazi Germany through WWII

Maschinenpistole 35 (MP35)
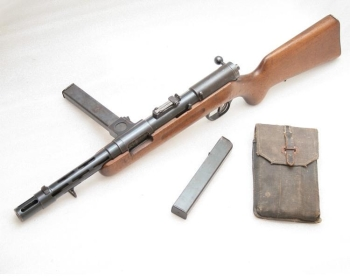
- Bergmann MP35 with a spare magazine and a pouch.
- Type: Submachine gun
- Place of origin: Nazi Germany

Service history
- In service: 1935–1945
- Used by: See Users
- Wars: Chaco War; Spanish Civil War; World War II

Production history
- Designer: Emil Bergmann
- Designed: 1932
- Manufacturer: Bergmann, Schultz & Larsen
- Produced: 1935-1944
- No. built: ~40,000
- Variants: BMP32, Bergmann MP34

Specifications
- Mass: Unloaded 4.24 kg (9.3 lb)
- Length: 840 mm (33.1 in)
- Barrel length: 200 mm (7.9 in)
- Cartridge: 9×19mm Parabellum
- Action: open bolt blowback
- Rate of fire: ~540 round/min
- Muzzle velocity: ~365 m/s (1,198 ft/s)
- Effective firing range: 150–200 m (490–650 ft, 160–220 yds)
- Feed system: 24- or 32-round detachable box magazine
- Sights: Front post, notched adjustable rear

The MP35 (Maschinenpistole 35, 'Machine Pistol 35') was a submachine gun used by the Wehrmacht, Waffen-SS and German police both before and during World War II. It was developed in the early 1930s by Emil Bergmann (son of Theodor Bergmann) and manufactured at the Bergmann company in Suhl (that also built one of the first submachine guns, the MP 18).

== History ==
The forerunner of the MP35 was the MP32 that Danish company Schultz & Larsen produced (under licence from the Bergmann company) and which was chambered for 9×23mm Bergmann ammunition. The BMP32 design was later updated by the Bergmann factory and in 1934, the Bergmann MP34 submachine gun appeared (not to be confused with different Steyr MP34). The limited manufacturing capabilities at the Bergmann plant required production to be shifted to Carl Walther's Zella-Mehlis plant. This German company produced some 2,000 BMP34s for export and domestic sales.

Several variants of the BMP34 were manufactured with a 200mm standard or 320mm barrel. During 1935, a simplified version of the BMP34 designated as Bergmann MP35/I appeared. Initial production orders for MP35 were also placed at Walther, which made about 5,000 SMGs between 1936 and 1940.

With the outbreak of World War II, production once again shifted from Walter to Junker & Ruh (manufacture code 'ajf') to manufacture the MP35 weapon (which it did through to 1944). During the war, about 40,000 Bergmann submachine guns were produced by Junker, and almost all were supplied to the Waffen-SS.

== Operation ==
The MP35 was a blowback operated, selective fire SMG which fired from an open bolt. The weapon featured a non-reciprocating cocking handle placed at the rear of the receiver, which was operated in a similar fashion to bolt-action on a Mauser rifle. This involved the weapon carrier to manually pull the handle up, pull backwards, push forwards and lock back down. When the gun was then fired the cocking handle remained stationary.

On the BMP32 the weapon featured a safety at the rear of the bolt (again in a similar location to the Mauser rifle). On both BMP34 and MP35 the safety was relocated to the left side of the receiver. The shooter could select the mode of firing by applying different pressure to the trigger – a short pull fired single shots; a long pull resulted in full automatic fire. Feed was from the right side of the gun, for some mysterious reason, with ejection to the left.

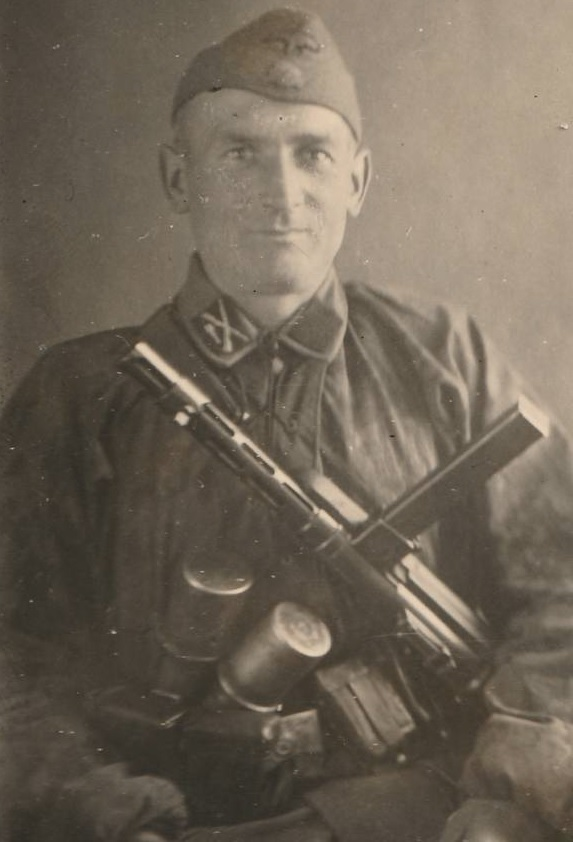
A portrait of Karl Johannes Jung as a member of the SS-Sonderbataillon Dirlewanger. In this photo, he is holding an MP35.

In contrast to many other SMGs of the time the MP35's magazine was inserted from the right-hand side of the weapon. Early versions used proprietary magazines, the BMP35 used Schmeisser MP28-compatible magazines. The barrel was enclosed into tubular jacket with cooling slots and muzzle brake/compensator at the front.

== Users ==
- Bolivia
- Brazil — MP35 adopted by Bahia police; in 1938 one was borrowed by the Alagoas police and used in the raid that killed Lampião
- Denmark — The Bergmann MP32 was adopted as the Maskinpistol m/32 when adopted by the Danish Army in 9mm Bergmann.
- Ethiopian Empire
- Kingdom of Hungary — The acquisition of 1430 is documented between 1937 and 1941. There are recollections of the acquisition of another 3000, but this cannot be proven by documents. The MP35s were used by paratroopers and special forces as well as the gendarmerie.
- Italian Partisans — Used examples captured from German soldiers
- Nazi Germany — Adopted by the Waffen-SS. Captured Danish MP32 guns were designated as the MP 741(d).
- Francoist Spain
- Sweden — Designated as k-pist m/39.
- Thailand — Used for executing prisoners by the Department of Corrections.
- (Kingdom of Yugoslavia) Yugoslavia — Both Partisans and Chetniks used captured ex-German MP35s.

== See also ==
- Suomi KP/-31
- PPD-40
- PPSh-41
- MP 40
