= Swing rifle =

Swing Target Rifle
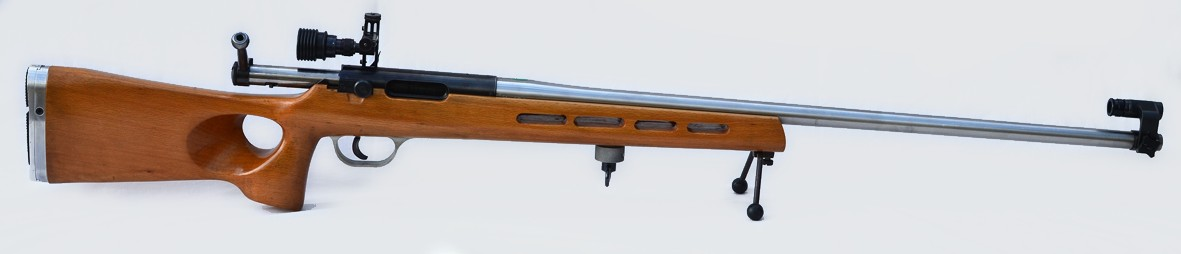
- A Swing Mk4
- Type: Bolt-action rifle
- Place of origin: United Kingdom

Production history
- Designer: George Swenson & Laurie Ingram
- Designed: 1972
- Manufacturer: Swing Firearms Ltd
- Produced: 1972 – c. 1990
- Variants: 5

Specifications
- Cartridge: 7.62×51mm
- Action: Bolt-action
- Feed system: Single-shot

The Swing rifle was a design developed by a number of target shooting enthusiasts who came together in 1970 at Bisley. The design's primary instigators were George Swenson and Laurie Ingram. At the time target rifle competition in the UK was dominated by designs based on military actions such as those of the Lee–Enfield and Mauser 1898. These designs were felt to have reached the limits of their development potential; especially when combined with commercially manufactured or hand-loaded ammunition.

Swenson and Ingram's aim was to develop a design that incorporated the best in target rifle design but maintained adherence to the requirement of the British National Rifle Association that rifles should be of a ‘conventional design and safe’ and be within the size and weight constraints imposed by competition rules.

== Development ==
Swenson had been employed by the London gunmaker John Wilkes of Beak Street and whilst with them had commissioned the manufacture of a 'Universal' target sight and a copy of the Finnish Mantari match trigger. He was also the UK importer of Schultz & Larsen cut-rifled barrels. All of these products were later to appear in the Swing products.

Swenson stated that his primary aim was to 'concentrate on the importance of the trigger'. This, combined with a firing action ("lock time") that was measured at less than 1.7 milliseconds, was a significant feature in its early success.

In 1972, having successfully developed a prototype (manufactured by Churwick Engineering who had worked for Swenson while at Wilkes) Swenson and Ingram created Swing Firearms Ltd which marketed model SIN 71 Mk1 rifle. The "SIN" of 1971 commemorated in the model name was for George Swenson being disqualified by the NRA for using a 'diopter' visual aid in his backsight, an aid which is now allowed and helps shooters who are no longer young to see the target clearly. The action type was subsequently named as the SWING (for SWenson and INGram). Years after he died, the NRA posthumously 'pardoned' Swenson.

The basic design was:

A single shot, bolt action, target rifle in 7.62×51mm calibre.

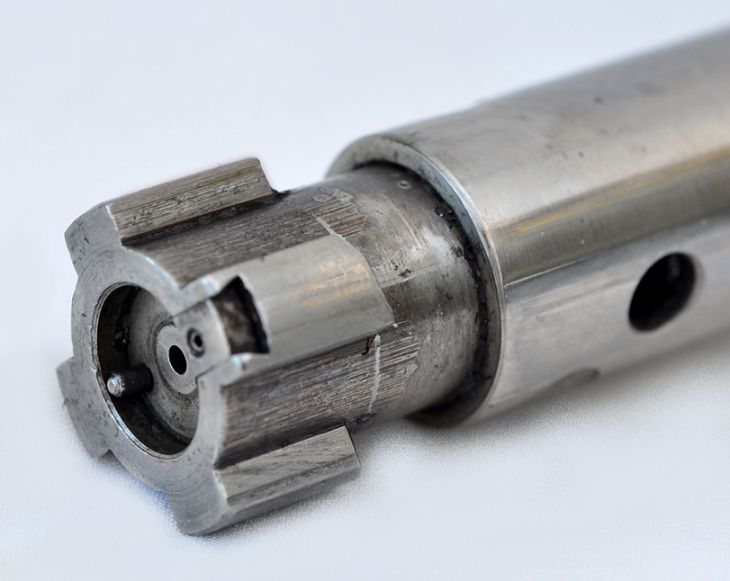
Swing Mk4 Bolt Head showing four large lugs

A bolt having four locking lugs derived from the Schultz & Larsen Model 54J of 1953 and 62M of 1961. The lugs were moved to the front of the bolt (as opposed to the Schultz & Larsen design) but were of the same 'generous' size. The position of the lugs, at 45 degrees when closed, was suggested to be a compromise between the compensation characteristics of the Mauser and Lee–Enfield types of action with the former locking vertically and the latter horizontally.

The Mantaari type trigger. The design came from Scandinavia where it had been designed as a match replacement for the Swedish Mauser 95 rifle.

The case recess in the bolt head was deeper at 3mm (.118”) than the standard 2.5mm (.100) set originally by Mauser. This depth was necessitated by the form of the radial sliding extractor. A spring-loaded ejector was fitted.

A bolt stop operating in a slot milled in the bolt body tube.

Further marks were developed as follows:

=== Mark 2 ===
- Radial sliding extractor;
- Improved finish,

=== Mark 3 ===
- Investment cast body, with integrated recoil lugs;
- Bolt lugs guided full travel length by corresponding slot rails in the body;
- Bolt lug diameter increased to improve guidance in body rails;
- One piece bolt.

=== Mark 4 ===
Various body improvements; primarily internal, including:

- The barrel threads a more conventional UN 1040 × 16 tpi;
- Longer barrel shank;
- Bedding Screws are now ¼ × 28 UNF.
- Bolt lug diameter increased;
- The opening movement of the bolt lightened by reducing the firing pin travel thus reducing the cocking cam angle.
- New bolt stop,
- A light metal firing pin, with a redesigned hard tip to reduce the risk of bending and breakage.
- Improvements to the extractor mechanism.
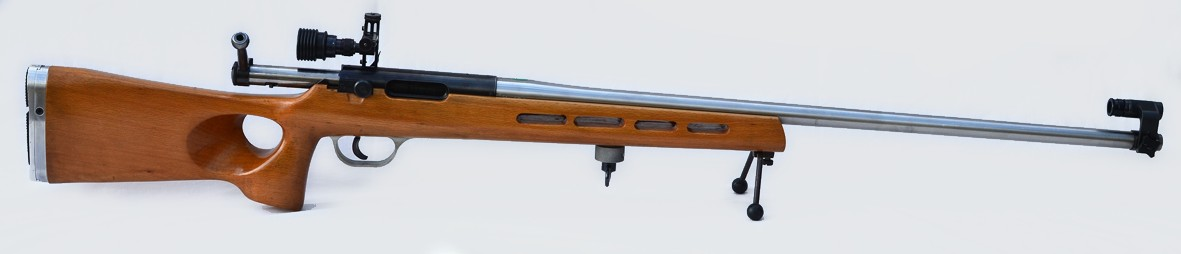
Swing Mark 4 rifle from the right side.

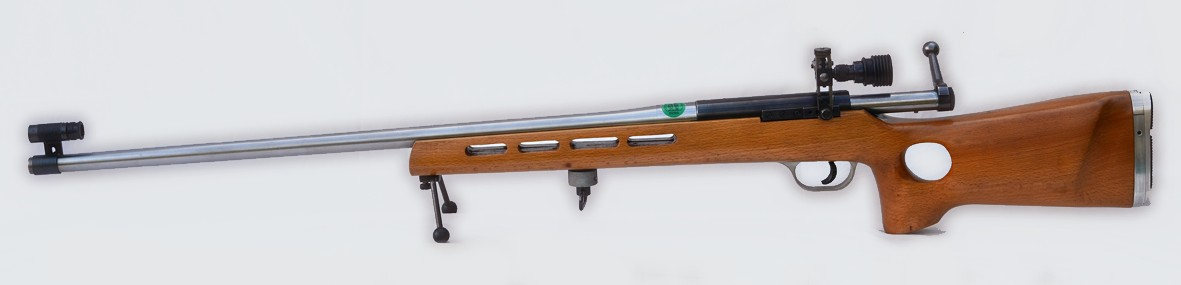
Swing Mark 4 rifle from the left side.

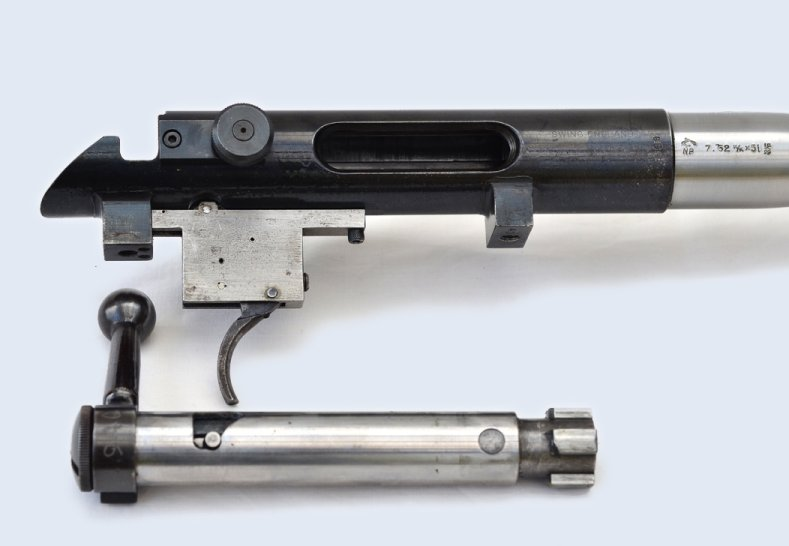
Swing Mark 4 rifle action and bolt.

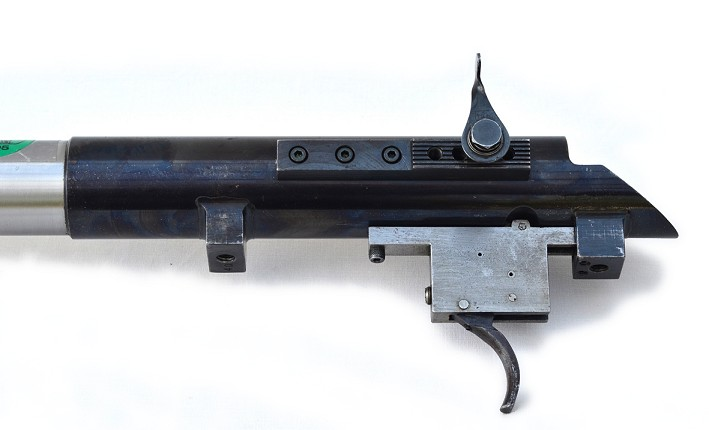
Swing Mark 4 rifle left side of action.

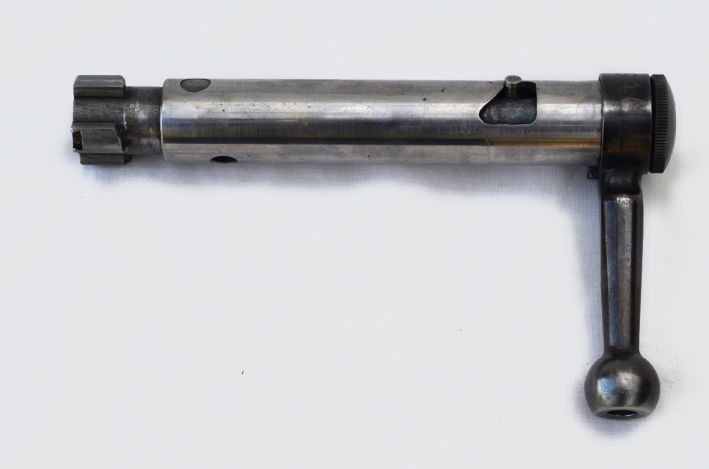
Swing Mark 4 rifle bolt.

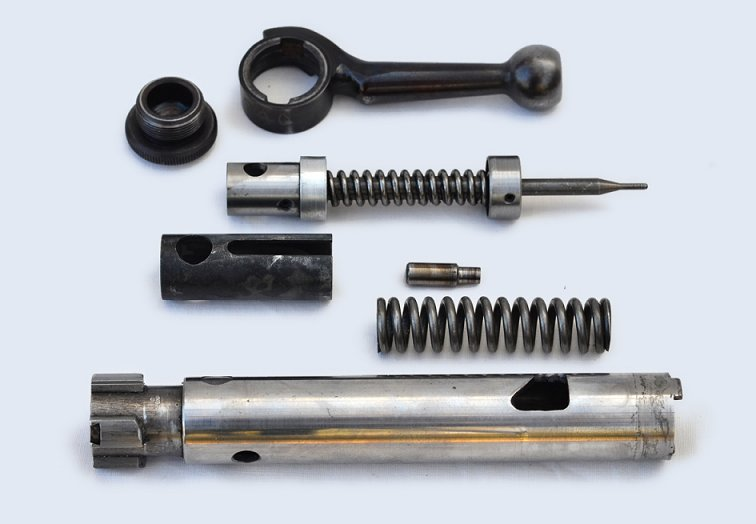
Swing Mark 4 rifle bolt disassembled.

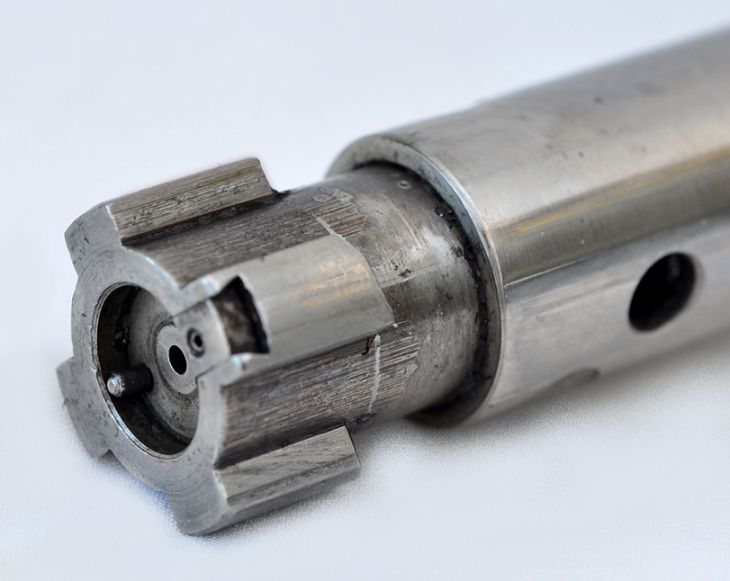
Swing mark 4 rifle bolt head.

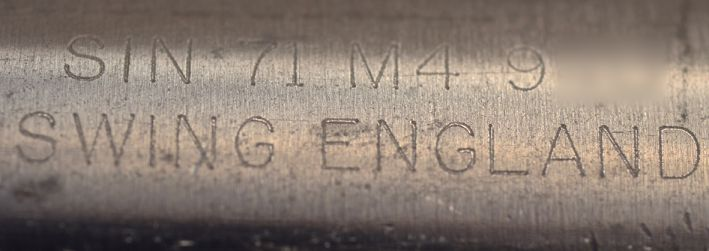
Swing Mark 4 rifle type markings.

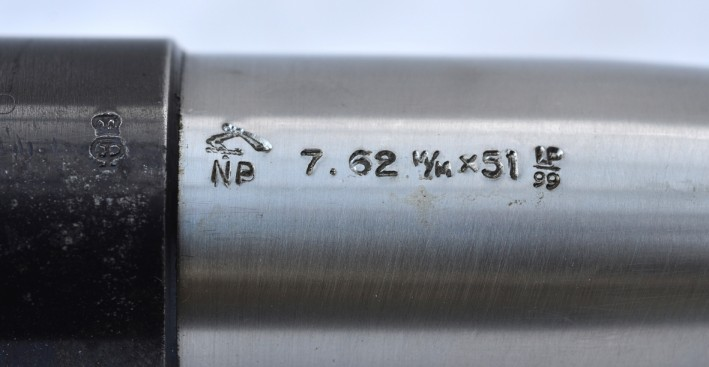
Swing Mark 4 rifle proof markings

=== Mark 5 ===
A Mark 5 model exists but it is believed that this is just a number change. In the 1986 documentary "Bisley The Queen's Prize", while reviewing the complete history of winning rifles of the competition, what is purported to be a SIN 71 M5 is fired around the 31 minute and 45 second mark.

Following the death of George Swenson, a William Floyd inherited some parts and the rights to the Swing rifle. During this period the final Swing rifles were produced engraved with Swenson's signature and these have become collectable items.

The Swing rifle is no longer in production but its design features have been continued in types such as the RPA and Paramount rifles.

== See also ==
- Omark Model 44 - contemporary purpose-built target rifle from Australian manufacturer Sportco.
- Musgrave RSA Target Rifle - contemporary target rifle from South Africa.
