= Uffe Schultz Larsen =

Danish sport shooter (1921–2005)

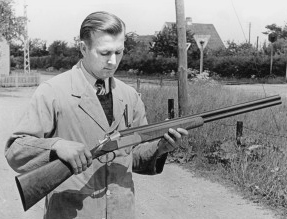
- Uffe Schultz Larsen in 1945

Personal information
- Born: 2 June 1921 Otterup, Denmark
- Died: 29 November 2005 (aged 84) Otterup, Denmark
- Height: 181 cm (5 ft 11 in)
- Weight: 76 kg (168 lb)

Sport
- Sport: Sports shooting
- Event: Rifle
- Club: Sportskytteklubben, Odense
Medal record
Representing Denmark
World Championships
Silver medal – second place	1952 Oslo	50 m rifle prone (40 shots)

Uffe Schultz Larsen (2 June 1921 – 29 November 2005) was a Danish sport shooter who won a silver medal in the 50 m rifle prone position at the 1952 World Championships. He competed in various events at the 1948, 1952, 1956 and 1960 Summer Olympics with the best result of 13th place. His father Niels Larsen and grandfather Hans Schultz were also Olympic rifle shooters.
