= .222 rimmed =

Centrefire fire cartridge

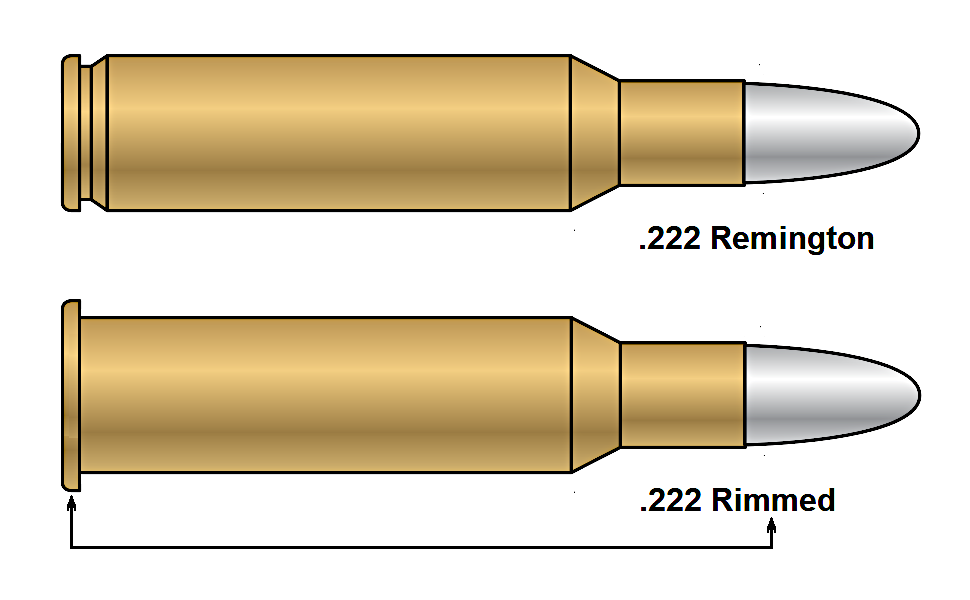
- Type: Rifle
- Place of origin: Australia

Production history
- Designed: 1960s

Specifications
- Case type: Rimmed, bottleneck
- Bullet diameter: .224 in (5.7 mm)
- Neck diameter: .265 in (6.7 mm)
- Shoulder diameter: .360 in (9.1 mm)
- Base diameter: .375 in (9.5 mm)
- Rim diameter: .450 in (11.4 mm)
- Case length: 1.700 in (43.2 mm)
- Overall length: 2.130 in (54.1 mm)
- Rifling twist: 1-12"
- Primer type: Small rifle

Ballistic performance
Bullet mass/type	Velocity	Energy
45 gr (3 g) HP	3,450 ft/s (1,050 m/s)	1,185 ft⋅lbf (1,607 J)
50 gr (3 g) SP	3,162 ft/s (964 m/s)	1,110 ft⋅lbf (1,500 J)
55 gr (4 g) SP	3,070 ft/s (940 m/s)	1,148 ft⋅lbf (1,556 J)
70 gr (5 g) SP	2,880 ft/s (880 m/s)	1,288 ft⋅lbf (1,746 J)
- Test barrel length: 24"

The .222 rimmed / 5.7x43mmR is an intermediate centrefire rifle cartridge, originating in Australia in the 1960s as a cartridge for single shot rifles, particularly the Martini Cadet action. Performance is similar to the .222 Remington on which it is based however loads should be reduced as the walls of the brass cases are generally thicker. Extraction of cases that have been loaded to higher pressures can be difficult due to the inefficient extraction method utilised by the Martini Cadet.

Cases and loaded rounds were originally produced by the Super Cartridge Company. Brass is now available from the Bertram Bullet Company or can be made from 5.6x50mmR RWS cases.

The .222 rimmed has also been used as a parent case for wildcats, similar to ones based on the .222 Remington, such as rimmed versions of the .17 Mach IV, the .17-222, and the .20 VarTarg.

== See also ==
- .222 Remington
- Martini Cadet
- List of rifle cartridges
