= Omark Model 44 =

- Type: Target Rifle
- Place of origin: Australia

Production history
- Designed: 1968
- Manufacturer: Sportco, Omark, MAB
- Produced: 1968-
- Variants: Target Rifle, Silhouette Rifle; Pistol

Specifications
- Mass: 8+ lbs
- Barrel length: 26 inch
- Cartridge: 7.62×51mm, 5.56×45mm
- Action: bolt
- Feed system: single shot
- Sights: Tunnel front; Aperture rear

The Omark Model 44 is a bolt-action single-shot target rifle made in Australia. First released in 1968 as the Sportco Model 44 produced in Sportco's Adelaide factory, production was taken over by Omark in the 1970s, then by MAB Engineering in Brisbane in 1984.

The rifle was the mainstay of Australian full bore target shooting for many years replacing the .303in. Lee–Enfield. Being a purpose-built target rifle it soon showed its superiority against rebarrelled surplus rifles. It was also popular in Canadian competitions. Omark Model 44 rifles have also been used as a hunting arm. In this capacity however, they must be treated with special care — like any precision rifle, the fine mechanism is vulnerable to jamming when exposed to mud or dirt.

The Omark Model 44 was tested as a sniper rifle by the Australian Defence Force but not adopted, as it is single shot only and the design could not easily be changed to a repeater.

Originally just produced in 7.62×51mm it was later available in 5.56×45mm and others. MAB Engineering also produced a pistol version.

== See also ==
- Swing rifle - an early British target rifle also designed to supersede the Lee-Enfield
