= .32-20 Winchester =

American rimmed rifle/pistol cartridge

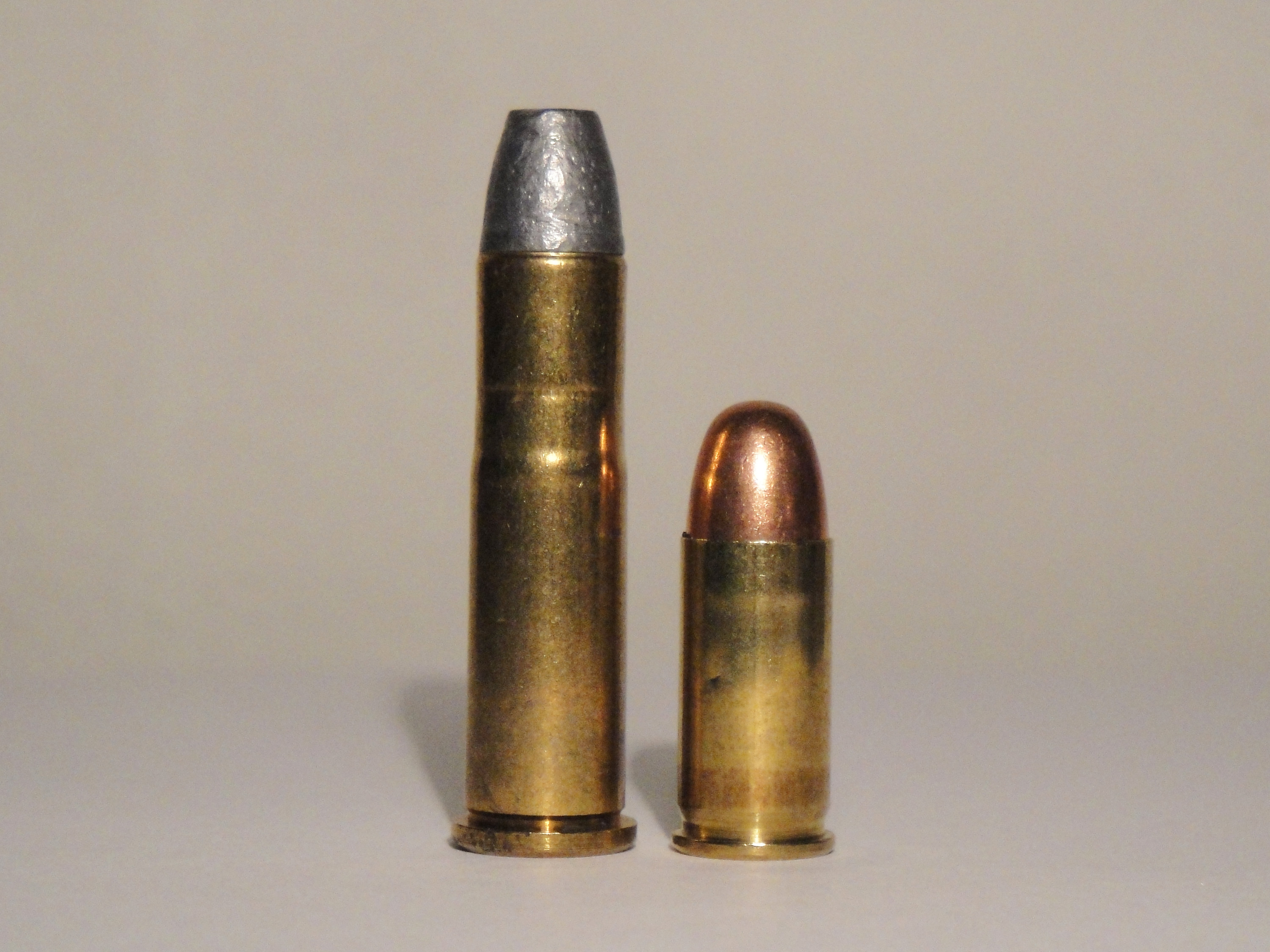
- .32-20 (Left), .32 ACP (Right)
- Type: Rifle, revolver
- Place of origin: United States

Production history
- Designer: Winchester Repeating Arms Company
- Designed: 1882
- Produced: 1882–present

Specifications
- Case type: Rimmed, bottleneck
- Bullet diameter: .3125 in (7.94 mm)
- Land diameter: .3051 in (7.75 mm)
- Neck diameter: .327 in (8.3 mm)
- Shoulder diameter: .342 in (8.7 mm)
- Base diameter: .354 in (9.0 mm)
- Rim diameter: .408 in (10.4 mm)
- Rim thickness: .065 in (1.7 mm)
- Case length: 1.315 in (33.4 mm)
- Overall length: 1.592 in (40.4 mm)
- Rifling twist: 1 in 20 in (510 mm)
- Primer type: Small pistol
- Maximum CUP: 16,000 CUP

Ballistic performance
Bullet mass/type	Velocity	Energy
85 gr (6 g) JHP	1,100 ft/s (340 m/s)	228 ft⋅lbf (309 J)
115 gr (7 g) CL	900 ft/s (270 m/s)	207 ft⋅lbf (281 J)
100 gr (6 g) CL (Rifle)	1,210 ft/s (370 m/s)	325 ft⋅lbf (441 J)
- Sources: "Cartridges of the World", Chuck Hawks

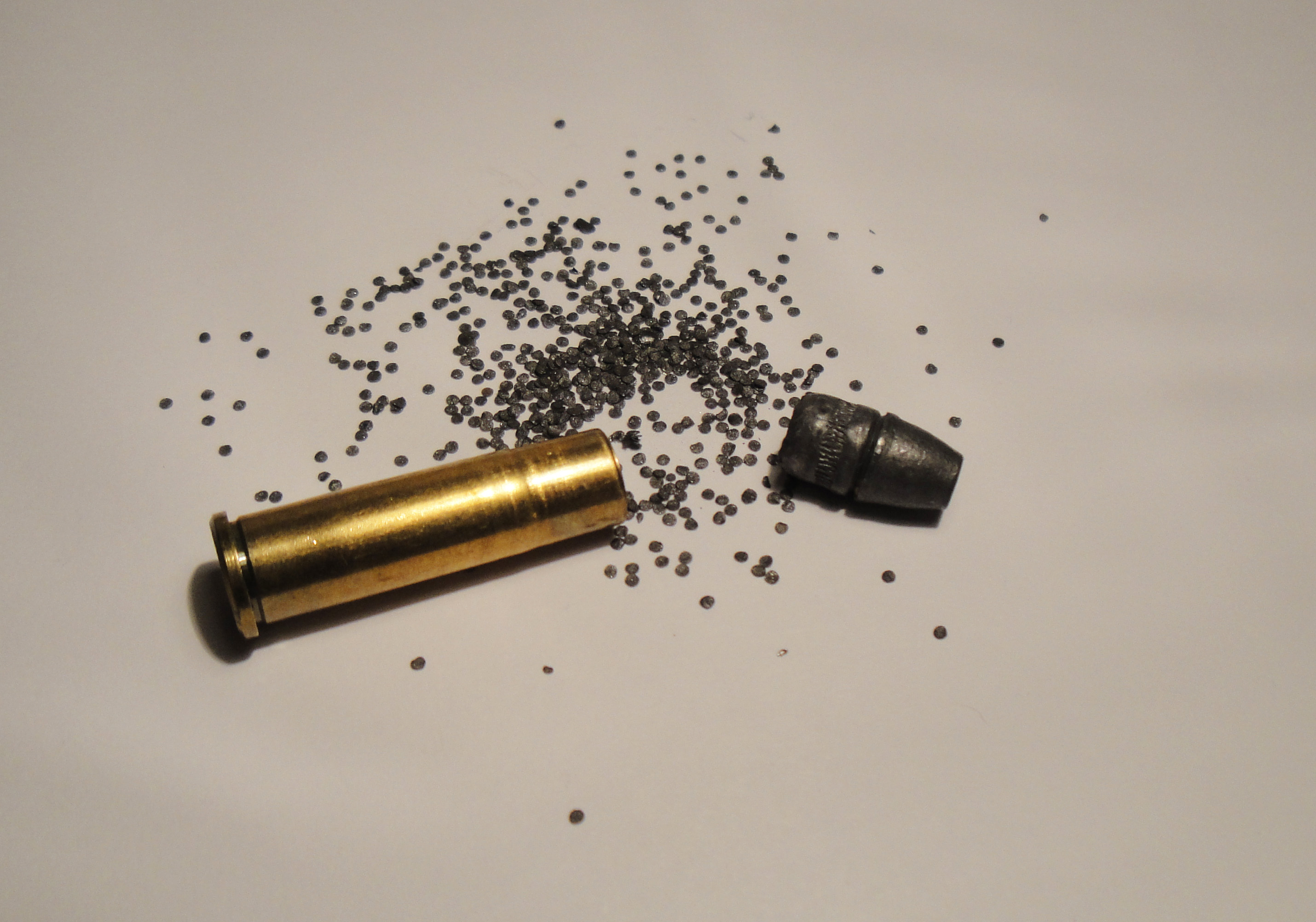
disassembled .32-20 Winchester cartridge with 100 grain lead bullet

The .32-20 Winchester / 7.94x33mmR, also known as .32 WCF (Winchester center fire), was the first small-game lever-action intermediate cartridge that Winchester produced. It was initially introduced as a black-powder cartridge in 1882 for small-game, varmint hunting, and deer. Colt produced a single-action revolver chambered for this cartridge a few years later.

The name .32-20 refers to the 32 caliber bullet of .312-inch-diameter (7.9 mm) and standard black-powder charge of 20 grains (1.3 g).

== Performance ==
This cartridge was sometimes used for deer hunting in the past, and William Lyman, the designer of rifle sights, said of it: "For large game, of course, a .32-20 W.C.F. cartridge is rather small, but it comes nearer to being an all-around cartridge in my opinion than any other." Many now consider it too light and low-powered for deer and better suited to small game and metallic silhouette. It has a good reputation for accuracy in rifles as well as the few handguns that have been chambered for it. Because of its low power, it destroys very little meat, making it a good hunting round for appropriately sized game, up to about 100 yards (91 m). Although it is an inexpensive cartridge to reload, care must be taken by the reloader because of the extremely thin walls of the cartridge case. Energy and pressure levels for handloading are determined based on the strength and condition of the firearm action to be used. Because most firearms chambered for this cartridge are older (e.g. early model Winchester Model 73 and 92 rifles as well as older Colt and Smith & Wesson revolvers) factory ammunition usually has reduced pressures from what can be achieved through handloading. Most factory ammunition exhibits ballistics of about 1,200 ft/s (370 m/s) and 325 ft⋅lbf (441 J) of energy at the muzzle with a 100-grain (6.5 g) bullet from an 18 to 20 inch rifle barrel. The performance characteristics of the cartridge listed in the sidebar should be considered maximum performance parameters obtainable, and even then only with a modern weapon designed for higher pressure loads. Factory-type loads - and reloads mimicking factory type loads - are the safe maximum loads for use in older firearms. Few, if any, companies still manufacture firearms in this caliber.

== Daughter cartridges ==
The .25-20 Winchester cartridge is simply a necked-down version of the .32-20. In addition, the .218 Bee was created using the .32-20 as its parent cartridge.

The .32-20 cartridge case has been used to create usable ammunition for the Nagant M1895. This is accomplished by removing .01" from the rim thickness and sizing the case in a specific reloading die (Lee Nagant 3 die set). The ammunition produced is functional and easy to reload; however, .32-20 brass does not provide a gas seal as it is not long enough to protrude past the Nagant cylinder. The .32-20 cartridge case can also be used to create 8mm French Ordnance ammunition for use in the Modèle 1892 revolver.

Currently, the .32-20 is used and modified by shooters in the UK and Australia for the .310 Cadet cartridge. Modifications involve length resizing and in most cases reducing the rim thickness. Due to the .310 using a heeled projectile, the neck thickness is not too much of a concern, after first being case length resized to 1.075" (27.3 mm). Most .310 cadet chambered rifles need to have the rim of the .32-20 case reduced from 0.065" to under 0.045" (1.7 mm to 1.14 mm), to allow proper head spacing and operation of rifle. However, in the instance of a lever action .32-20 fitted with a .310 barrel, the rifle will cycle better without the case rim thickness being reduced. As home reloading is the main option for the .310, many shooters play with different case length reduction of the .32-20, anywhere from 0.875'' to 1.185'' (22.23 mm to 30.10 mm).

== See also ==
- 32-20 Blues, a song by Delta Blues musician Robert Johnson and many other cover versions.
- 8 mm caliber
- H&R Handy-Gun
- .327 Federal Magnum, modern revolver cartridge with similar ballistics
- List of rimmed cartridges
- List of rifle cartridges
- Table of handgun and rifle cartridges
