= Mauser M 98 =

- Type: Bolt-action rifle
- Place of origin: Germany

Production history
- Designed: 1898
- Manufacturer: Mauser Jagdwaffen GmbH
- Produced: 1898–1936; 2009–present
- Variants: Mauser M 98 Magnum

Specifications
- Mass: 3.6 kg (7.9 lb) (M 98); 4.4 kg (9.7 lb) (M 98 Magnum)
- Length: 1,130 mm (44.49 in) (M 98); 1,185 mm (46.65 in) (M 98 Magnum)
- Barrel length: 600 mm (23.62 in) (M 98); 620 mm (24.41 in) (M 98 Magnum)
- Cartridge: Various
- Action: Bolt action
- Muzzle velocity: Various
- Feed system: 4 to 5-round internal magazine
- Sights: Various iron sights or telescopic sight.

The Mauser M 98 is a bolt-action rifle of German origin. The production of the controlled round feed Mauser 98 system for the German military ceased at the end of World War II in 1945, and the new Mauser M 98 and M 98 Magnum rifles, intended for the civilian market, have been produced in the city of Isny im Allgäu in Germany by Mauser Jagdwaffen GmbH, a subsidiary of SIG Sauer.

The modern Mauser M 98 is practically a civilian version of the Karabiner 98k, which was one of the final developments in the long line of Mauser 98 military rifles dating back to World War I. Similar to the Kar98k, though more modern in appearance, the M 98 is offered in many different hunting rifle specializations.

== Features ==
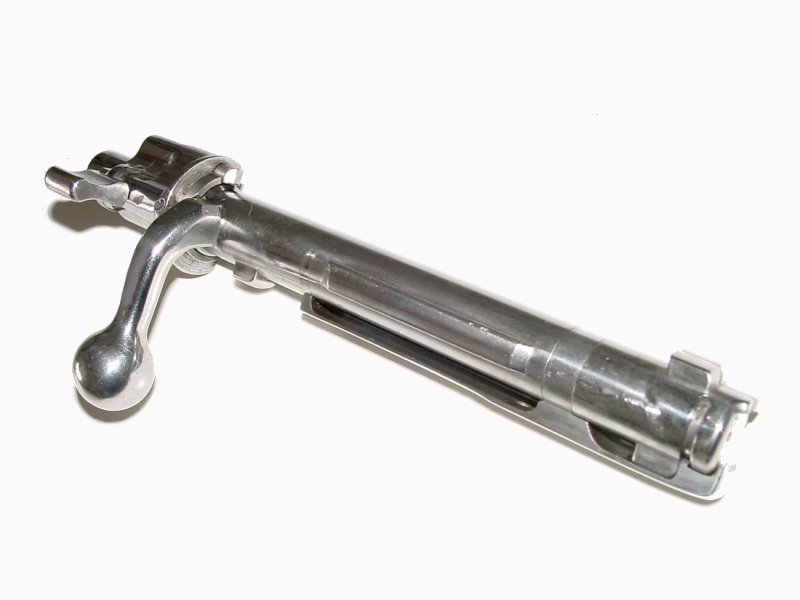
Mauser M 98 bolt.

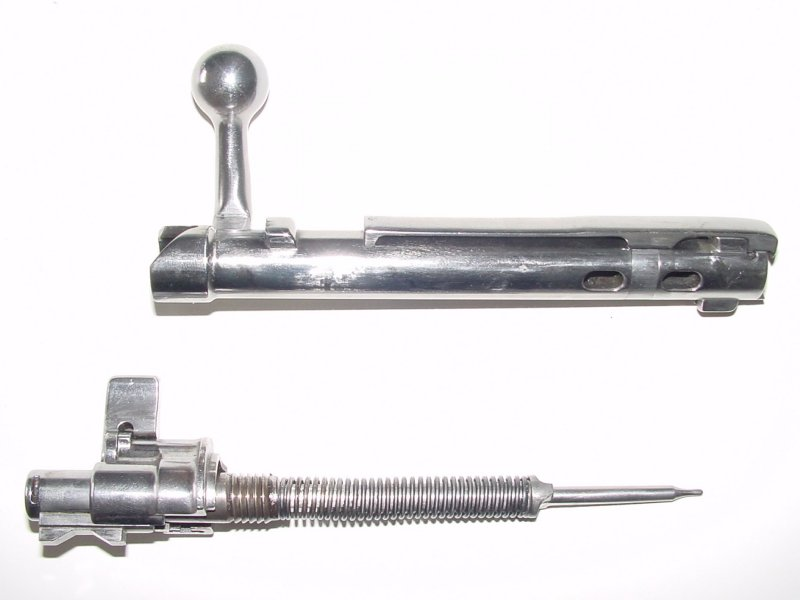
Mauser M 98, bolt and firing pin and safety mechanism field stripped.

The M 98 system consists of a receiver that serves as the systems shroud and a bolt group of which the bolt body has three locking lugs, two large main lugs - of which the left is slotted - at the bolt head and a third safety lug at the rear of the bolt which serves as a backup in case the primary locking lugs failed. This third lug is a distinctive feature and was not present on previous Mauser bolt action designs. The two main locking lugs display a locking surface of 56 mm^{2}, whilst the third safety lug normally plays no part in locking the action to avoid asymmetric and hence unbalanced bolt thrust forces. The diameter of the receiver was also enlarged compared to previous Mauser receivers for additional strength and safety. The bolt handle is permanently attached to the bolt and on the Mauser M 98 series is turned-down for use with optical sights.

Another distinctive feature of the M 98 system is the controlled round feed mechanism, consisting of a large, non-rotating claw extractor that engages the cartridge case rim as soon as the round leaves the magazine and firmly holds the cartridge case until the round is ejected by the ejector, mounted inside the receiver. Combined with a slight bolt retraction at the last stage of the bolt opening cycle, caused by the cammed surface on the rear receiver bridge, this results in a positive cartridge case extraction. The M 98 bolt action will cycle correctly irrespective of the way the rifle is moved or positioned during the bolt cycling action or if the cartridge has been fired or not. Only if the bolt is not brought back far enough, sharply enough, in a controlled round feed bolt action the cartridge case may not be cleanly ejected and a jam may result.

The bolt houses the firing pin mechanism that gets cocked when the bolt is opened and the cocking piece protrudes visually and tactilely from the rear of the bolt to indicate the action is cocked. This bolt sleeve lock was not present on previous Mauser bolt action designs and reduced firing pin travel and lock time.

The action features large gas relief holes and a gas shield on the bolt sleeve designed to protect the users head in case of a primer or cartridge rupture or detonation. When the action suffers a catastrophic failure it is designed to deflect the debris away from the operator's face.

The Mauser M 98 bolt mechanism can be easily removed from the receiver simply by pulling out the bolt stop, located at the left wall of the receiver, and then by rotating and pulling the bolt out.

=== Safety ===
The Mauser M 98 rifle features the traditional Mauser three-position safety located at the rear of the bolt. Operating the safety mechanism can be done by switching the catch towards the right (safety on, bolt locked), the middle (safety on, bolt can be opened for reloading), and to the left (ready to fire). The rifle must be cocked, otherwise the safety will not move. The safety itself secures the firing pin and the safety can only be released by firing the rifle while ready to fire or by closing the cocked bolt with a previously-pulled trigger that must be kept pulled back during the closing operation. Disengaging the safety by closing the bolt is only possible with the safety set in the ready position.

=== Barrel ===
The standard barrel length is 600 mm (23.62 in) for the M 98 and 620 mm (24.41 in) for the M 98 Magnum variant. Other barrel lengths are available upon request for the M 98 and M 98 Magnum variant. As an option, the rifles can be ordered with an integral barrel with a quarter rib, sight base, and a sling swivel.

=== Sights ===
The iron sights are direct and zeroed at 50, 100 and 150 meters. A Rigby-style diopter sight is also available. The rifle is assembled with swing-off telescopic sight mounts.

=== Stock ===
A hand-rubbed oil-finished walnut wood stock comes built with the rifle, along with a cheekpiece, a rubber recoil pad, and a pistol grip cap.

== Chamberings ==
The standard M 98 is available in 7×57mm Mauser, .308 Winchester, .30-06 Springfield, 8×57 IS, and 9.3×62mm.

== Variants ==
The Mauser M 98 Magnum is a higher-velocity variant intended for safari hunting, where absolute reliability of the weapon under adverse conditions is very important.

They can be chambered in .375 Holland & Holland Magnum, .416 Rigby, and .450 Rigby with box magazine capacities.
