= .218 Bee =

Cartridge

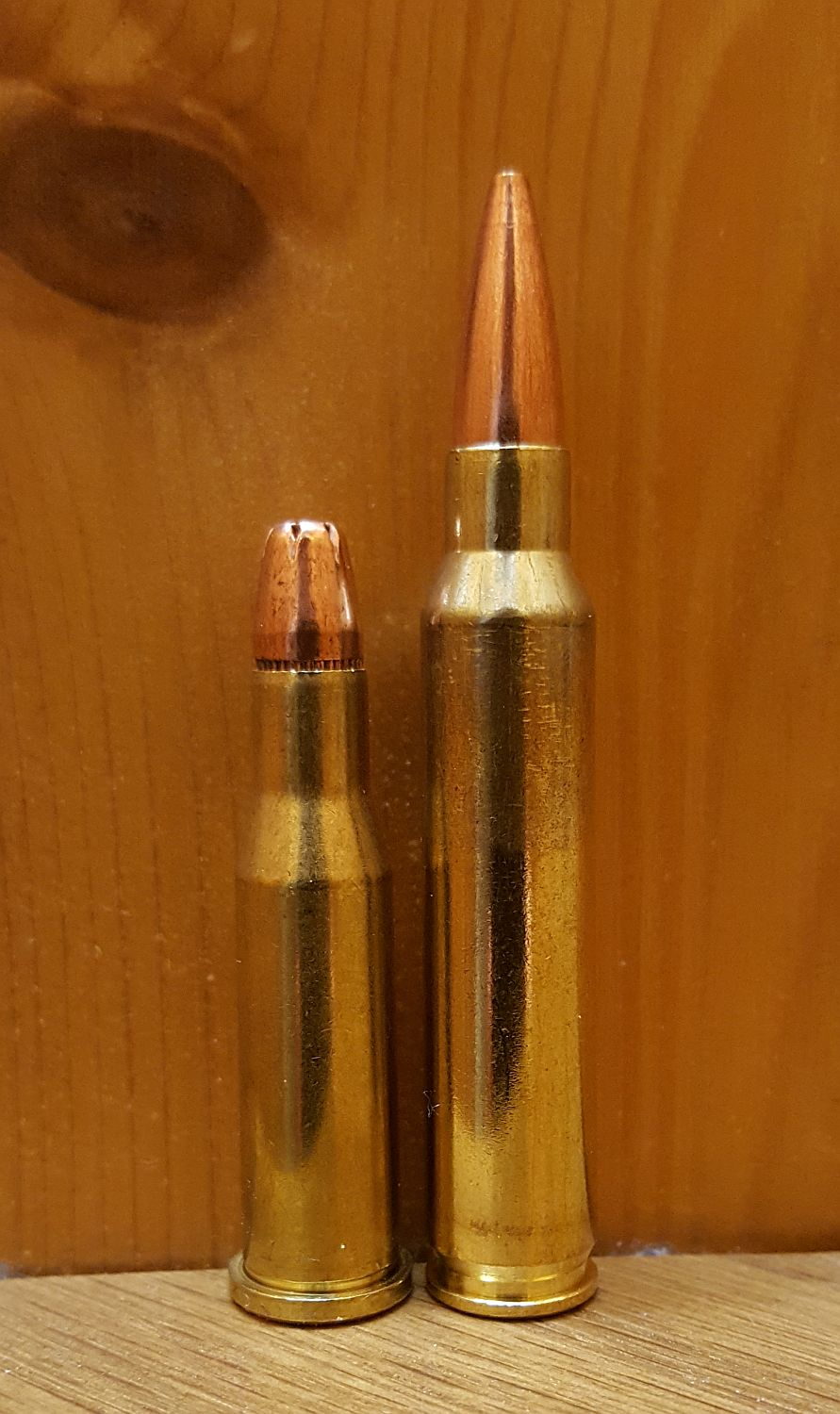
- Left, compared to .223 Remington
- Type: Rifle
- Place of origin: US

Production history
- Designer: Winchester
- Designed: 1937
- Manufacturer: Winchester
- Produced: 1937–present
- Variants: .218 Mashburn Bee

Specifications
- Parent case: .32-20 Winchester
- Case type: Rimmed, bottleneck
- Bullet diameter: .224 in (5.7 mm)
- Neck diameter: .242 in (6.1 mm)
- Shoulder diameter: .329 in (8.4 mm)
- Base diameter: .349 in (8.9 mm)
- Rim diameter: .408 in (10.4 mm)
- Rim thickness: .065 in (1.7 mm)
- Case length: 1.345 in (34.2 mm)
- Primer type: Small rifle
- Maximum CUP: 40,000 CUP

Ballistic performance
Bullet mass/type	Velocity	Energy
35 gr (2 g) VMax	3,205 ft/s (977 m/s)	799 ft⋅lbf (1,083 J)
40 gr (3 g) BT	3,130 ft/s (950 m/s)	870 ft⋅lbf (1,180 J)
46 gr (3 g) JFP	2,708 ft/s (825 m/s)	749 ft⋅lbf (1,016 J)
50 gr (3 g) BT	2,654 ft/s (809 m/s)	782 ft⋅lbf (1,060 J)

The .218 Bee / 5.7x34mmR is a .22 caliber centerfire rifle cartridge designed for varmint hunting by Winchester in 1937. The cartridge was originally chambered in the Winchester Model 65 lever-action rifles, which may have ultimately led to its lack of popularity. The cartridge is named for the bore diameter of the barrel in which the cartridge is chambered rather than the usual practice in the United States of having the cartridge's nomenclature reflect in some way the bullet diameter.

== History ==
The .218 Bee cartridge was designed by Winchester for use in their Model 65 lever-action rifles. Winchester designed the cartridge by necking down the .25-20 Winchester cartridge to accept a .224 diameter bullet. Just as the .32-20 can be considered to be the parent cartridge of the .25-20, it can also be considered the parent cartridge to the .218 Bee. The cartridge was introduced as a commercial cartridge by Winchester in 1937 in their Model 65 lever action rifle, which was also chambered for the .25-20 and .32-20 Winchester cartridges. However, while the .25-20 and the .32-20 Model 65 rifles have 22-inch (560 mm) barrels, the rifles chambered for the Bee have 24-inch (610 mm) barrels.

Despite showing some early promise, the cartridge never really caught on, even though it was later chambered by Winchester in their new bolt-action Model 43 rifle and by Sako in their L-46 rifle. There was some question about the accuracy of the .218 Bee as compared to the .222, but that was likely due to the difference of inherent accuracy between the bolt-action rifles commonly chambered for the .222 and the lever-action rifles commonly chambered for the .218 Bee. Although not in common use, it is still a very effective cartridge in its class, for small to medium varmints out to about 200 yards (180 m). Production ammunition and rifles are still available from a few manufacturers.

== Performance ==
In terms of relative performance, the .218 Bee falls between the smaller .22 Hornet, and the larger .222 Remington and the more popular .223 Remington.

== See also ==
- 5 mm caliber
- List of rifle cartridges
- List of rimmed cartridges
- Table of handgun and rifle cartridges
