= Sportco =

Firearms manufacturer

- Traded as: Sporting Arms Limited
- Industry: Firearms
- Founded: 1947; 79 years ago in Adelaide, South Australia
- Founder: Jack Warne
- Defunct: Early 1980s
- Headquarters: Adelaide, South Australia, Australia

Sportco was an Australian manufacturer of rifles and shotguns in Adelaide, South Australia, from 1947 until the early 1980s. Founded by Jack Warne, also known by its full name Sporting Arms Limited, began by manufacturing single shot 22LR rifles. Sportco purchased ex military Martini Cadet rifles from the Australian Government and converted them to both rimfire and centrefire calibres as well as rebarrelling Lee–Enfield rifles to .303/22 and .303/25.

Soon they began producing their own designs of bolt action and 'Sportomatic' semi-automatic rifles as well as single shot shotguns followed by semi-automatic shotguns and pump-action rifles. They also started to export to Great Britain, Rhodesia, Borneo, South Africa, Canada, New Zealand and the United States of America.

Sportco supplied the British military with a blow-back action self-loading training rifle with a ten-round capacity. Sold in Australia as the Model 71S the British dubbed it Rifle L29A2. An example is to be found in the Enfield Pattern Room collection. Sportco also supplied Winchester with actions for their Model 320 10 shot bolt action repeater and Model 310 single shot.

Sportco also sold ammunition under its own brand name that was manufactured by Riverbrand and Winchester Australia.

Their longest lasting model was the Model 44 target rifle which would later would be known as the Omark Model 44 and would be produced by MAB Engineering when Sportco would close its doors.

Sportco was sold to Omark Industries and shut its doors in the early 1980s.

Jack Warne would later leave Australia for the United States and found Kimber of Oregon.

== Models ==
Caliber .22 LR

- ss Sportco Martini
- sa sportco 2
- sa Sportco 2A semi automatic box magazine
- br sportco 10
- br Sportco 10A bolt action box magazine
- br Sportco 15 bolt action tube magazine
- ss Sportco 40 bolt action single shot
- ss Sportco 43 bolt action single shot
- ss Sportco 46 bolt action single shot
- ss Sportco 50
- Sportco 61 bolt action box magazine
- Sportco 62 bolt action box magazine
- br Sportco 62A bolt action box magazine deluxe
- br Sportco 62S bolt action box magazine
- br Sportco 63 bolt action box magazine
- br Sportco 63A bolt action box magazine deluxe
- br Sportco 63B bolt action box magazine
- sportco 64B bolt action box magazine
- br Sportco 66D bolt action box magazine deluxe
- br Sportco 66S bolt action box magazine
- sa sportco s71
- sa Sportco 71A semi automatic box magazine deluxe
- sa Sportco 71S semi automatic box magazine have2 one is deluxe model
- sa Sportco 72A semi automatic tube magazine
- sa Sportco 73 semi automatic box magazine
- Sportco 73A semi automatic box magazine deluxe
- sa Sportco 73B semi automatic box magazine
- Sportco 74 semi automatic box magazine
- sa Sportco 87A semi automatic tube magazine
- pa Sportco 90 pump action box magazine
- pa Sportco 90A pump action box magazine
- Sportco 90S pump action box magazine
- pa Sportco 93 pump action box magazine
- Sportco 93A pump action box magazine deluxe
- Sportco 93B pump action box magazine
- Sportco 93S pump action box magazine
- sa Sportco carbine semi automatic box magazine
- ss Sportco Martini Clubmaster single shot target rifle
- br Winchester 320 bolt action box magazine

Calibre .22 Hornet, .222 Remington, .222 Rimmed

- br Sportco Hornet bolt action box magazine
- br Sportco 33S bolt action box magazine
- br sportco 33 bolt action box magazine deluxe
- Sportco Martini

Shotguns

- Sportco 54 single shot
- Sportco 55 single shot
- Sportco 80 single shot have 2
- Sportco 81 bolt action box magazine
- Sportco 83 bolt action box magazine
- Sportco 88 semi automatic
- Sportco 103 type 1 semi automatic
- Sportco 103 type 2 semi automatic chromed barrel
- Sportco 103 type 3 semi automatic deluxe
- Sportco 103 type 4 semi automatic deluxe chromed barrel
- Sportco 103 type 5 semi automatic 30" barrel

7.62mm Target Rifles

- Sportco Model 44 bolt action single shot

== See also ==
- List of South Australian manufacturing businesses
