= .25-20 Winchester =

Rifle cartridge

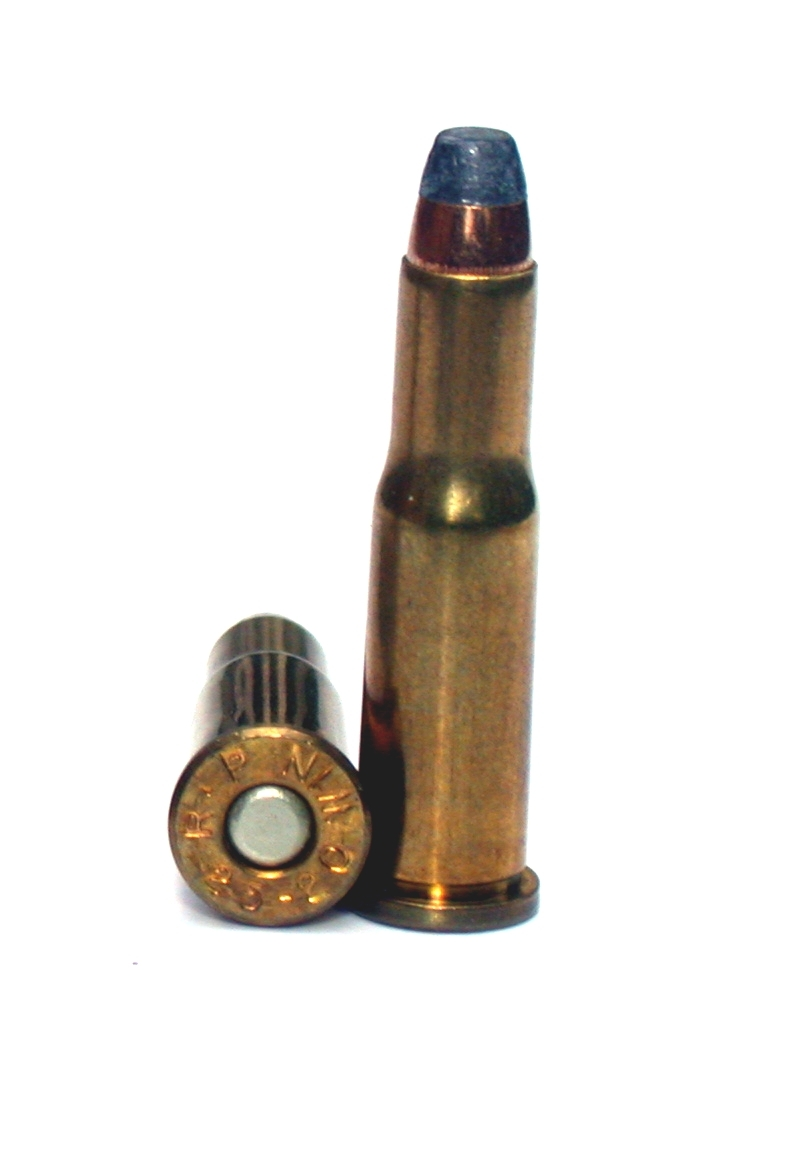
- Type: Rifle
- Place of origin: United States

Service history
- Used by: ranchers, trappers, small game hunters, metallic silhouette shooting, varmint hunters, mule hunters
- Wars: none

Production history
- Designed: 1892
- Manufacturer: Winchester
- Produced: 1895-present
- No. built: 90,750

Specifications
- Parent case: .32-20 Winchester
- Case type: Rimmed, bottlenecked
- Bullet diameter: .258 in (6.6 mm)
- Neck diameter: .274 in (7.0 mm)
- Shoulder diameter: .333 in (8.5 mm)
- Base diameter: .349 in (8.9 mm)
- Rim diameter: .408 in (10.4 mm)
- Rim thickness: .065 in (1.7 mm)
- Case length: 1.330 in (33.8 mm)
- Overall length: 1.592 in (40.4 mm)
- Primer type: Small rifle
- Maximum CUP: 28,000 CUP

Ballistic performance
Bullet mass/type	Velocity	Energy
60 gr (4 g) FP	2,101 ft/s (640 m/s)	588 ft⋅lbf (797 J)
75 gr (5 g) FP	1,877 ft/s (572 m/s)	587 ft⋅lbf (796 J)
86 gr (6 g) SP	1,673 ft/s (510 m/s)	535 ft⋅lbf (725 J)

The .25-20 Winchester / 6.6x33mmR, or WCF (Winchester center fire), intermediate cartridge was developed around 1895 for the Winchester Model 1892 lever action rifle. It was based on necking down the .32-20 Winchester. In the early 20th century, it was a popular small game and varmint round, developing around 1,460 ft/s with 86-grain bullets. But two years earlier Marlin Firearms Co. had already necked down the .32-20 Winchester, and called it the .25-20 Marlin. It was first chambered in Model 1889 lever action Marlins long before Winchester did the same thing and put their name on the .25-20.

While the SAAMI pressure rating is a full 28,000 CUP, modern ammunition is often loaded lighter in deference to the weaker steels used on many of the original guns. The early black powder cartridges were loaded to about 20,000 psi, but the SAAMI rating is close to that of the high velocity smokeless rounds produced later. The high velocity loadings developed 1,732 ft/s.

It was easy and economical to reload and was once a favorite with farmers, ranchers, pot hunters, and trappers. Though the .25-20 has been used on deer and even claimed the James Jordan Buck, a whitetail deer of long standing record in 1914, it is now rarely used on large-bodied game due to its feeble ballistics and light bullet construction, which make humane one-shot kills unlikely. Though the higher velocity loads would be destructive for small game use, the handloader can run heavier cast lead bullets such as the 85 gr. LRNFP at more sedate velocities around 1,000-1,200 FPS to anchor game with much more authority than the .22 Long Rifle, yet not destroy meat. The .25-20 is still a very viable small game, fur bearing and trapping cartridge.

The .25-20 Winchester is sometimes confused with the similarly named .25-20 Single Shot; the two cartridges are markedly different and do not interchange with one another.

== See also ==
- List of rimmed cartridges
- List of rifle cartridges
- Table of handgun and rifle cartridges
- 6 mm caliber
