= Ruger Model 96 =

Ruger 96
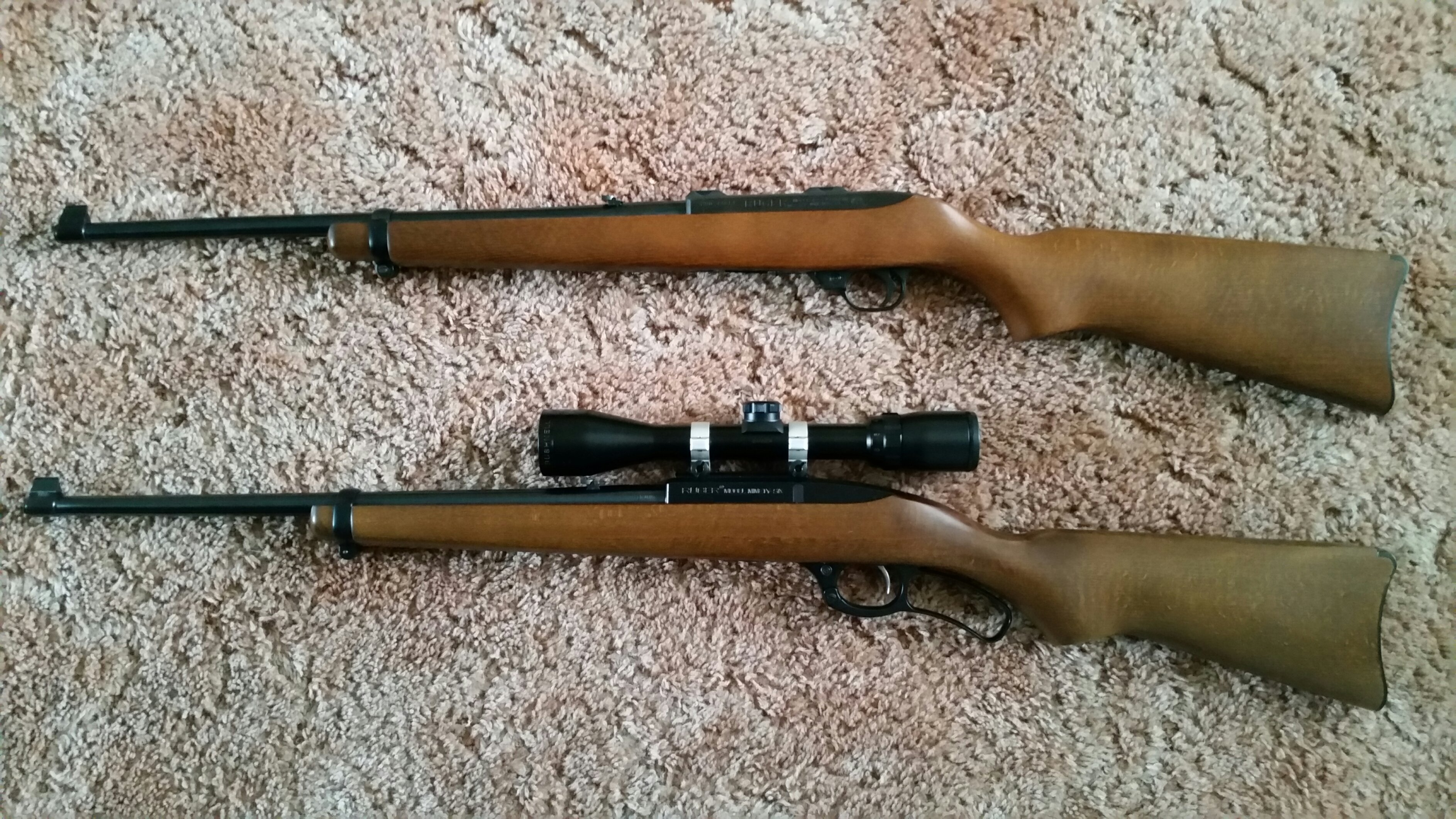
- Ruger 96/17 (bottom) compared to Ruger 10/22 22WMR (top)
- Type: Lever-action rifle
- Place of origin: United States

Production history
- Manufacturer: Sturm, Ruger & Co.
- Produced: 1996 - 2009
- Variants: 96/17 (.17 HMR); 96/22 (.22 LR); 96/22M (.22 WMR); 96/44 (.44 Mag)

Specifications
- Mass: 5.25 lb (2.38 kg)
- Length: 37.25 in (94.6 cm)
- Barrel length: 18.5 in (47 cm)
- Cartridge: .17 HMR, .22 LR, .22 Magnum, .44 Magnum
- Action: Short-Throw Lever-action
- Feed system: Rotary magazine: 10-rounds (.22 LR); 9-rounds (.17 HMR & .22 Mag); 4-rounds (.44 Mag); Box magazine: 25-rounds (.22 LR)
- Sights: Gold bead front, folding leaf rear

The Ruger Model 96 is a series of lever-action rifles produced by Sturm, Ruger & Co. They featured a short-throw lever action, cross button safety and a visible cocking lever. The 4 different variants of the Model 96 represented the four calibers the rifle came in: 96/17 for .17 HMR, 96/22 for .22 LR, 96/22M for .22 Magnum and 96/44 for .44 Magnum. All four models had a hardwood stock.

== 96/22 ==
The .22 LR 96/22 feeds from the same magazines as the popular Ruger 10/22 series. From the factory, it comes with the standard flush-fitting 10-round rotary magazine. Since it shares the magazine with the 10/22, the capacities available for the 96/22 include 10, 25, 50, etc. It utilizes the same v-block and barrels from the late model v-block style Ruger 77/22. Because of this, with an allen wrench, the owner can replace the barrel with a 77/22 barrel. To use a 10/22 barrel, the process is the same as converting a 10/22 barrel for use in a 77/22. Both the 77/22 and 96/22 have dual, opposed extractors. A slot for the left side extractor must be cut into a 10/22 barrel to use it in a 96/22 or 77/22.

== 96/44 ==
The .44 Remington Magnum 96/44 feeds from a four-round rotary magazine. It does not share magazines with the Ruger 77/44. The action of the 96/44 does not anchor itself directly to the stock with an action screw as almost all rifles do. There is a block on the underside of the barrel that is threaded for the action screw. The stock is attached to the barrel, and the barrel to the action. The rifled barrel has a twist rate of 1 turn in 20", allowing heavy hunting bullets to stabilize. This is relatively rare for .44 Magnum firearms, which usually are rifled at a rate of 1 turn in 38 inches. The 1:20" twist enables the use of 325gr ammunition for hunting large game.
