= Carbine =

Shortened version of a standard firearm

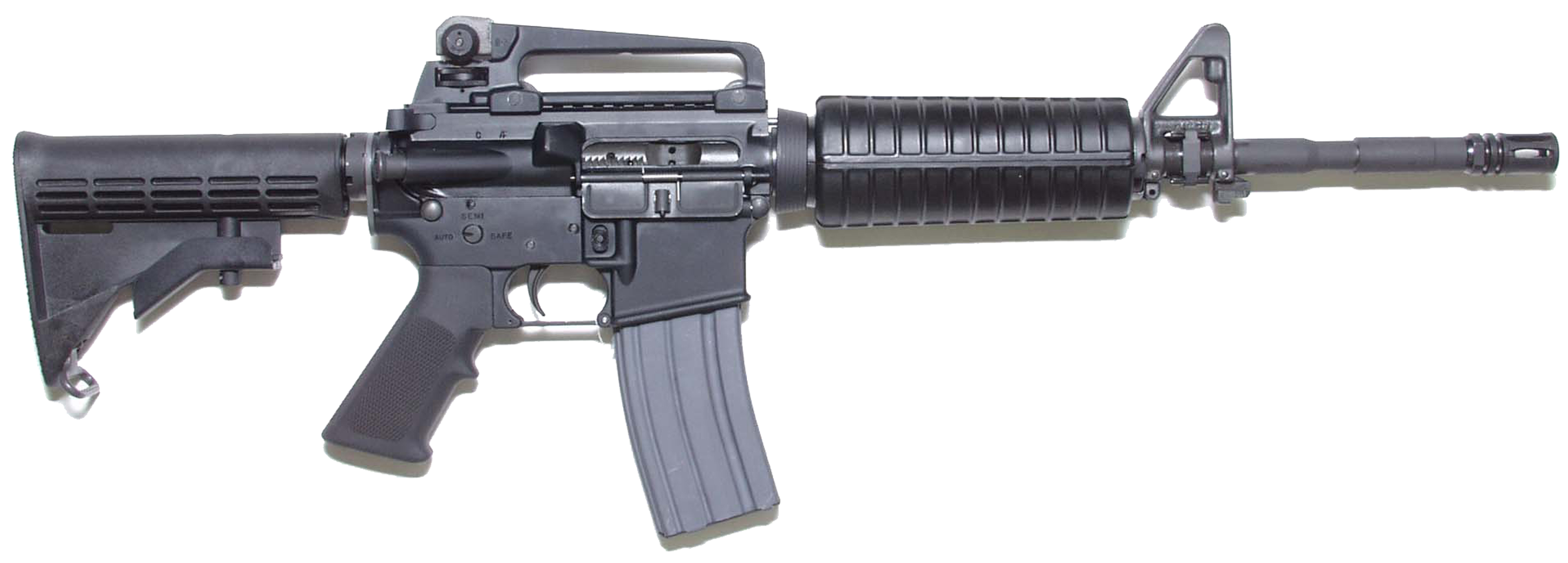
An M4 carbine, a common AR-15–style carbine. The M4 is the shorter, lighter carbine variant of the M16 rifle.

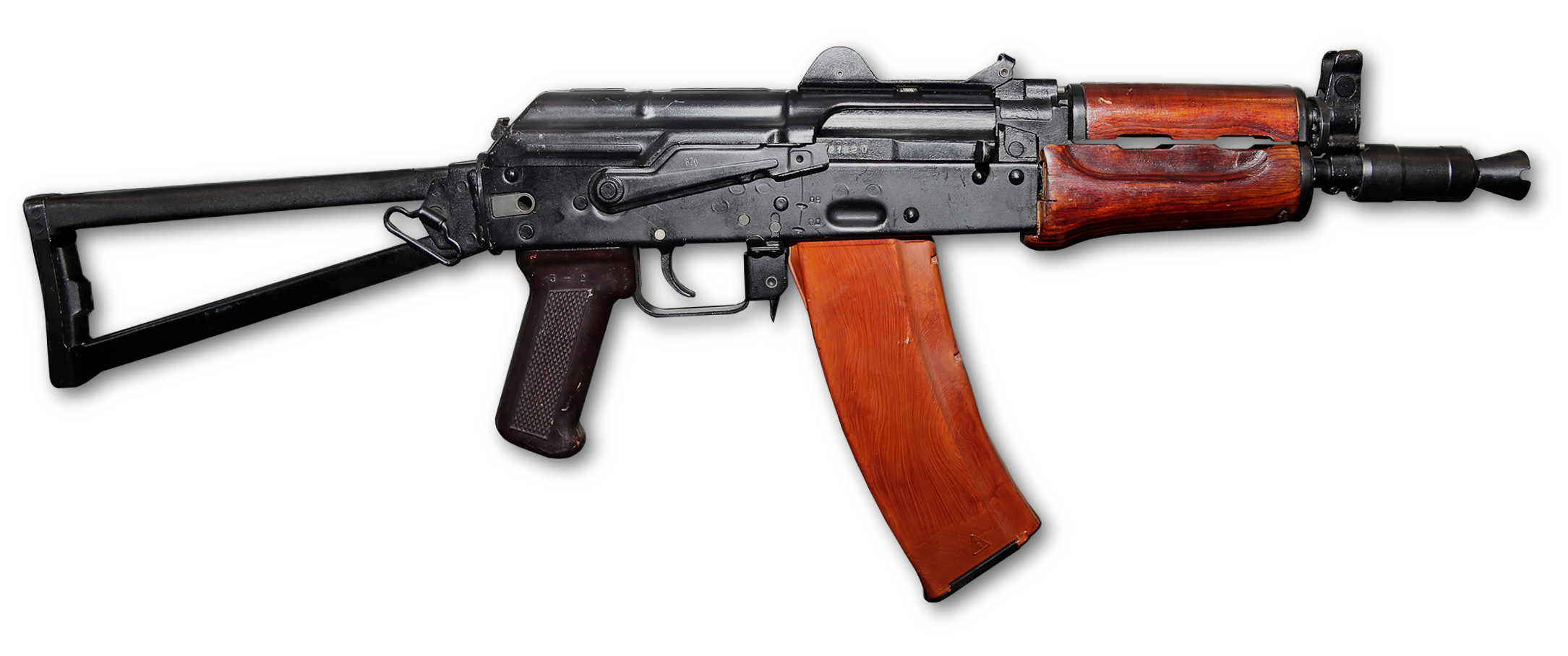
An AKS-74U with laminated wood furniture. The AKS-74U is the shorter, lighter carbine variant of the AK-74 rifle.

A carbine (/ˈkɑːrbiːn/ KAR-been or /ˈkɑːrbaɪn/ KAR-byn) is a long gun that has a barrel shortened from its original length. Most modern carbines are rifles that are compact versions of a longer rifle or are rifles chambered for less-powerful cartridges.

The smaller size and lighter weight of carbines make them easier to handle. They are typically issued to high-mobility troops such as special operations soldiers and paratroopers, as well as to mounted, artillery, logistics, or other non-infantry personnel whose roles do not require full-sized rifles, although there is a growing tendency for carbines to be issued to front-line soldiers to offset the increasing weight of other issued equipment. An example of this is the M4 carbine, the standard issue carbine of the United States Armed Forces.

== Etymology ==
The name comes from its first users – cavalry troopers called "carabiniers", from the French carabine, from Old French carabin (soldier armed with a musket), whose origin is unclear. One theory connects it to an "ancient engine of war" called a calabre; another connects it to Medieval Latin Calabrinus 'Calabrian'; yet another, less likely, to escarrabin, gravedigger, from the scarab beetle.

== History ==
=== Carbine arquebus and musket ===
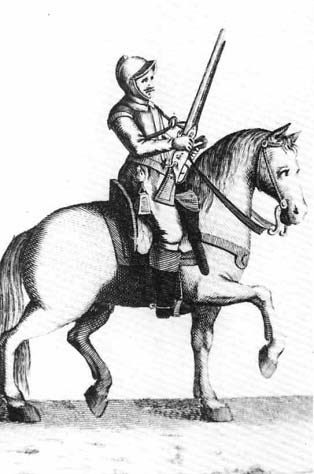
Harquebusier, carbine-armed cavalry, 17th century

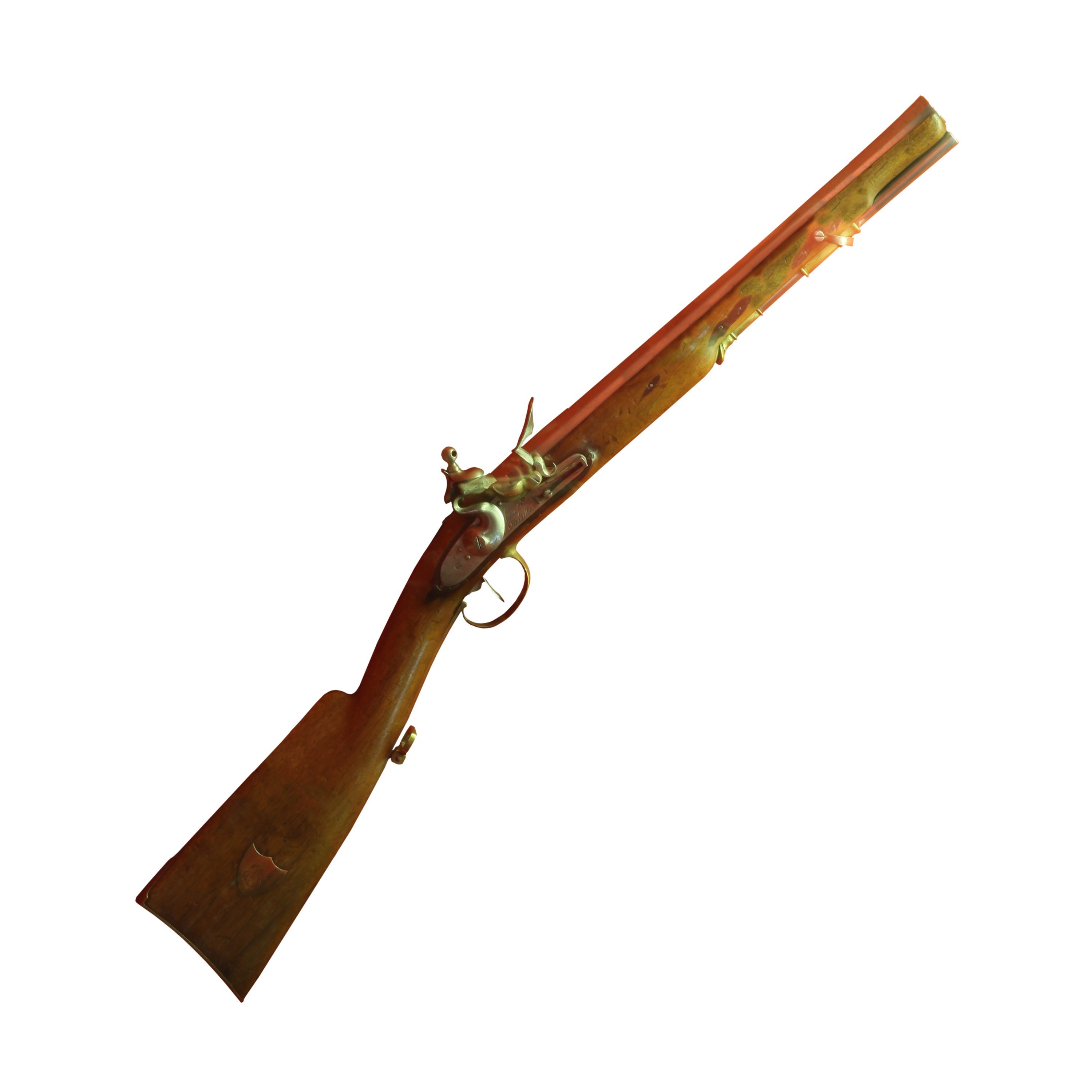
Carbine model 1793, used by the French Army during the French Revolutionary Wars

The carbine was originally developed for cavalry. The start of early modern warfare about the 16th century had infantry armed with firearms, prompting cavalry to do the same, even though reloading muzzle loading firearms while moving mounted was highly impractical. Some cavalry, such as the German Reiters, added one or more pistols, while other cavalry, such as harquebusiers, tried various shorter, lightened versions of the infantry arquebus weapons – the first carbines. But these weapons were still difficult to reload while mounted, and the saber often remained main weapon of such cavalry. Dragoons and other mounted infantry that dismounted for battles usually adopted standard infantry firearms, though some favored versions that were less encumbering when riding – something that could be arranged to hang clear of the rider's elbows and horse's legs.

While more portable, carbines were less accurate and had less power than the longer guns of the infantry. During Napoleonic warfare, pistol and carbine-armed cavalry generally transitioned into traditional melee cavalry or dragoons. Carbines found increased use outside of standard cavalry and infantry, such as support and artillery troops, who might need to defend themselves from attack but would be hindered by keeping full-sized weapons with them continuously; a common title for many short rifles in the late 19th century was artillery carbine.

=== Carbine rifle ===
As the rifled musket replaced the smoothbore firearms for infantry in the mid 19th century, carbine versions were also developed; this was often developed separately from the infantry rifles and, in many cases, did not even use the same ammunition, which made for supply difficulties.

A notable weapon developed towards the end of the American Civil War by the Union was the Spencer carbine, one of the first breechloading, repeating weapons. It had a spring-powered, removable tube magazine in the buttstock which held seven rounds and could be reloaded by inserting spare tubes. It was intended to give the cavalry a replacement weapon which could be fired from horseback without the need for awkward reloading after each shot – although it saw service mostly with dismounted troopers, as was typical of cavalry weapons during that war. The Austrian Model 1844 "Extra Corps" musketoon represents a notable artifact from the Civil War era, distinguished by its smoothbore configuration and .71 caliber (.69) rifled barrel. These musketoons were procured by Herman Boxer & Co., New York City, and imported into the United States during 1861-1862, contributing to the Union's strategic initiatives to equip its burgeoning military forces with small arms. The Confederate States has produced own carbine like the Keen-Walker, and Morse. They purchase import muzzleloaders M1851 carbine for Missouri Militia Cavalry, and early bolt-action system like the Terry's patent carbine.

In the late 19th century, it became common for a number of nations to make bolt-action rifles in both full-length and carbine versions. One of the most popular and recognizable carbines was the lever-action Winchester carbines, with several versions available firing revolver cartridges. This made it an ideal choice for cowboys and explorers, as well as other inhabitants of the American West, who could carry a revolver and a carbine, both using the same ammunition.

The Lee–Enfield cavalry carbine, a shortened version of the standard British Army infantry rifle was introduced in 1896, although it did not become the standard British cavalry weapon until 1903.

=== World Wars ===
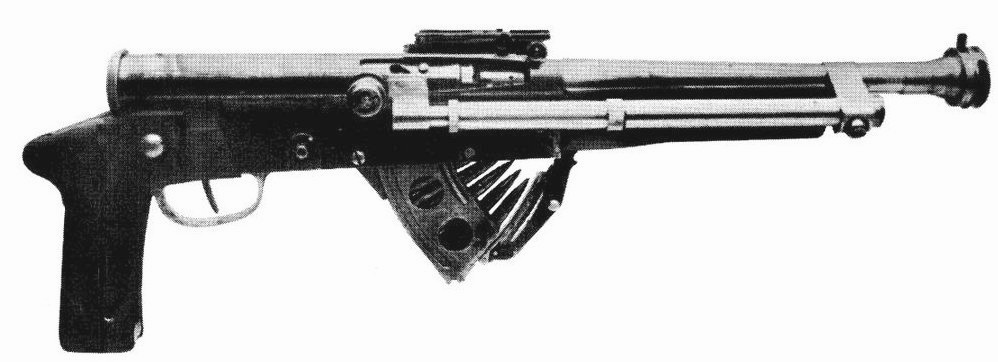
Chauchat-Ribeyrolles

In late 1918, France developed the Chauchat-Ribeyrolles for tank crews to defend themselves. Developed from the Fusil Automatique Modèle 1917, the stock was replaced with a pistol grip, and the barrel is significantly shorter at 340 mm (13 in) resulting in an overall length of 575 mm (22.6 in).

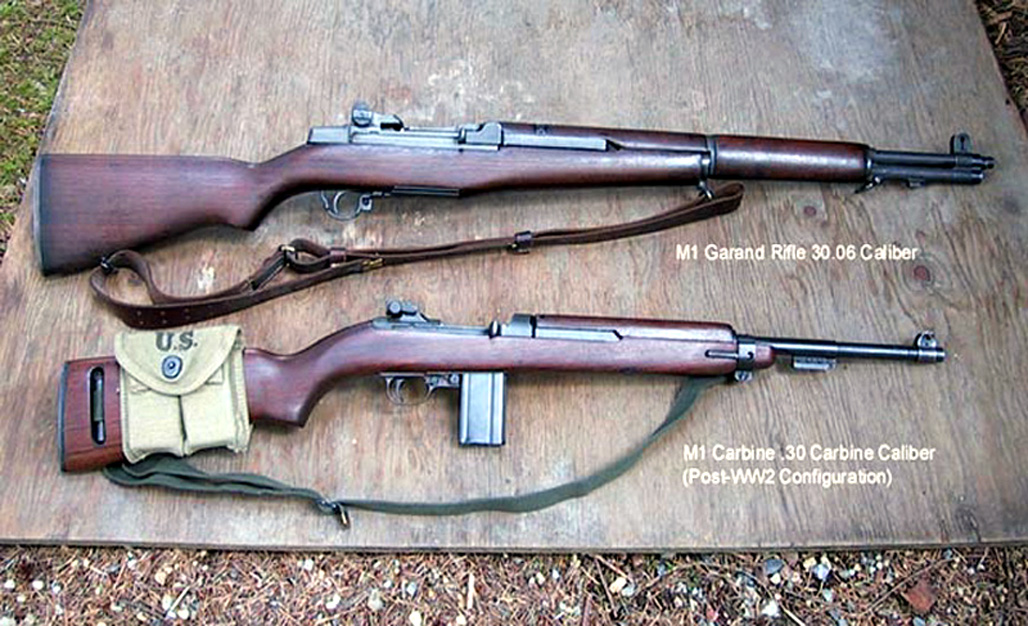
M1 Garand and M1 carbine

In the decades following World War I, the standard battle rifle used by armies around the world had been growing shorter, either by redesign or by the general issue of carbine versions instead of full-length rifles. This move was initiated by the U.S. Model 1903 Springfield, which was originally produced in 1907 with a short 610 mm (24 in) barrel, providing a short rifle that was longer than a carbine but shorter than a typical rifle, so it could be issued to all troops without need for separate versions. Other nations followed suit after World War I, when they learned that their traditional long-barreled rifles provided little benefit in the trenches and merely proved a hindrance to the soldiers. Examples include the Russian Model 1891 rifle, originally with an 800 mm (31 in) barrel, later shortened to 730 mm (29 in) in 1930, and to 510 mm (20 in) in 1938; and the German Mauser Gewehr 98 rifles went from 740 mm (29 in) in 1898 to 600 mm (24 in) in 1935 as the Karabiner 98k (K98k or Kar98k), or "short carbine".

The barrel lengths in rifles used by the United States did not change between the bolt-action M1903 rifle of World War I and the World War II M1 Garand rifle, because the 610 mm (24 in) barrel on the M1903 was still shorter than even the shortened versions of the Model 1891 and Gewehr 98. The U.S. M1 carbine was more of a traditional carbine in that it was significantly shorter and lighter, with a 450.9 mm (17.75 in) barrel, than the M1 Garand rifle, and that it was intended for rear-area troops who could not be hindered with full-sized rifles but needed something more powerful and accurate than a Model 1911 pistol (although this did not stop soldiers from using them on the front line). Contrary to popular belief, and even what some books claim, in spite of both being designated "M1", the M1 carbine was not a shorter version of the .30-06 M1 Garand, as is typical for most rifles and carbines, but it was a wholly different design, firing a smaller, less-powerful cartridge. The "M1" designates each as the first model in the new U.S. designation system, which no longer used the year of introduction but a sequential series of numbers starting at "1": the M1 carbine and M1 rifle.

The United Kingdom developed a "jungle carbine" version of their Lee–Enfield service rifle, featuring a shorter barrel, flash suppressor, and manufacturing modifications designed to decrease the rifle's weight Officially titled Rifle, No. 5 Mk I, it was introduced in the closing months of World War II, but it did not see widespread service until the Korean War, the Mau Mau uprising, and the Malayan Emergency as well as the Vietnam War.

=== Post World War II ===
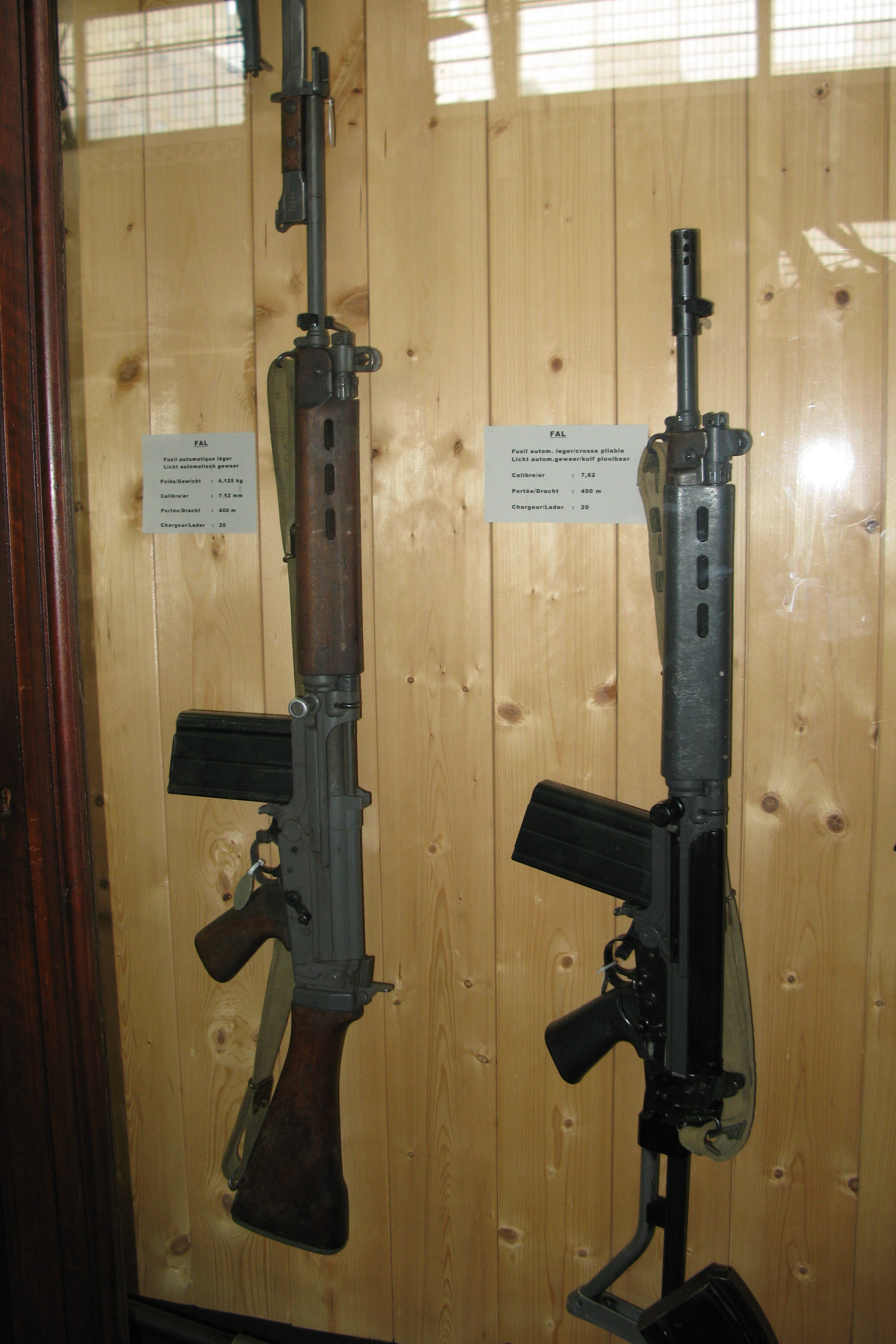
FN FAL rifle – (left) full size, (right) carbine/paratrooper variant with a folding stock and shortened barrel

A shorter weapon was more convenient when riding in a truck, armored personnel carrier, helicopter, or aircraft, and also when engaged in close-range combat. Based on the combat experience of World War II, the criteria used for selecting infantry weapons began to change. Unlike previous wars, which were often fought mainly from fixed lines and trenches, World War II was a highly mobile war, often fought in cities, forests, or other areas where mobility and visibility were restricted. In addition, improvements in artillery made moving infantry in open areas even less practical than it had been.

The majority of enemy contacts were at ranges of less than 300 metres (330 yards), and the enemy was exposed to fire for only short periods of time as they moved from cover to cover. Most rounds fired were not aimed at an enemy combatant but instead fired in the enemy's direction to keep them from moving and from firing back. These situations did not require a heavy rifle, firing full-power rifle bullets with long-range accuracy. A less-powerful weapon would still produce casualties at the shorter ranges encountered in actual combat, and the reduced recoil would allow more shots to be fired in the short amount of time an enemy was visible. The lower-powered round would also weigh less, allowing a soldier to carry more ammunition. With no need of a long barrel to fire full-power ammunition, a shorter barrel could be used. A shorter barrel made the weapon weigh less, was easier to handle in tight spaces, and was easier to shoulder quickly to fire a shot at an unexpected target. Full-automatic fire was also considered a desirable feature, allowing the soldier to fire short bursts of three to five rounds, increasing the probability of a hit on a moving target.

The Germans had experimented with selective-fire carbines firing rifle cartridges during the early years of World War II. These were determined to be less than ideal, as the recoil of full-power rifle cartridges caused the weapon to be uncontrollable in full-automatic fire. They then developed an intermediate-power cartridge round, which was accomplished by reducing the power and the length of the standard 7.92×57mm Mauser rifle cartridge to create the 7.92×33mm kurz (short) cartridge. A selective-fire weapon was developed to fire this shorter cartridge, eventually resulting in the Sturmgewehr 44, which literally translates to Storm Gun 44 but can also be translated as assault rifle 44, it is considered the world's first assault rifle (it was also frequently called "machine carbines" by Allied intelligence). Very shortly after World War II, the USSR adopted a similar weapon, the ubiquitous AK-47, the first model in the famed Kalashnikov series, which became the standard Soviet infantry weapon and which has been produced and exported in extremely large numbers up through the present day.

Although the United States had developed the M2 carbine, a selective-fire version of the M1 carbine during WW2, the .30 carbine cartridge was closer to a pistol round in power, making it more of a submachine gun than an assault rifle. It was also adopted only in very small numbers and issued to few troops (the semi-automatic M1 carbine was produced in a 10-to-1 ratio to the M2), while the AK47 was produced by the millions and was standard-issue to all Soviet troops, as well as those of many other nations. The U.S. was slow to follow suit, insisting on retaining a full-power, 7.62×51mm NATO rifle, the M14 (although this was selective fire).

In the 1950s, the British developed the .280 British, an intermediate cartridge, and a select-fire bullpup assault rifle to fire it, the EM-2. They pressed for the U.S. to adopt it so it could become a NATO-standard round, but the U.S. insisted on retaining a full-power, .30 caliber round. This forced NATO to adopt the 7.62×51mm NATO round (which in reality is only slightly different ballistically from the .308 Winchester), to maintain commonality. The British eventually adopted the 7.62mm FN FAL, and the U.S. adopted the 7.62mm M14 rifle. These rifles are both what is known as battle rifles and were a few inches shorter than the standard-issue rifles they replaced (22-inch (560 mm) barrel as opposed to 24 inches (610 mm) for the M1 Garand), although they were still full-powered rifles, with selective fire capability. These can be compared to the even shorter, less-powerful assault rifle, which might be considered the "carbine branch of weapons development", although indeed, there are now carbine variants of many of the assault rifles which had themselves seemed quite small and light when adopted.

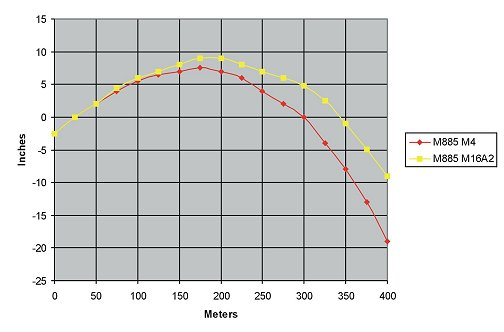
Bullet drop of the M16A2 rifle (yellow) vs M4 carbine (red)

By the 1960s, after becoming involved in war in Vietnam, the U.S. did an abrupt about-face and decided to standardize on the intermediate 5.56×45mm NATO round (based on the .223 Remington varmint cartridge) fired from the new, lightweight M16 rifle, leaving NATO to hurry and catch up. Many of the NATO countries could not afford to re-equip so soon after the recent 7.62mm standardization, leaving them armed with full-power 7.62mm battle rifles for some decades afterwards, although by this point, the 5.56mm has been adopted by almost all NATO countries and many non-NATO nations as well. This 5.56mm NATO round was even lighter and smaller than the Soviet 7.62×39mm AK-47 cartridge but possessed higher velocity. In U.S. service, the M16 assault rifle replaced the M14 as the standard infantry weapon, although the M14 continued to be used by designated marksmen. Although at 20 inches (510 mm), the barrel of the M16 was shorter than that of the M14, it was still designated a "rifle" rather than a "carbine", and it was still longer than the AK-47, which used a 16-inch (410 mm) barrel.

The SKS – an interim, semi-automatic, weapon adopted a few years before the AK-47 was put into service – was designated a carbine, even though its 20-inch (510 mm) barrel was significantly longer than the AK series' 16.3 inches (410 mm). This is because of the Kalashnikov's revolutionary nature, which altered the old paradigm. Compared to previous rifles, particularly the Soviets' initial attempts at semi-automatic rifles, such as the 24-inch (610 mm) SVT-40, the SKS was significantly shorter. The Kalashnikov altered traditional notions and ushered in a change in what was considered a "rifle" in military circles.

In 1974, shortly after the introduction of the 5.56mm NATO, the USSR began to issue a new Kalashnikov variant, the AK-74, chambered in the small-bore 5.45×39mm cartridge, which was a standard 7.62×39mm necked down to take a smaller, lighter, faster bullet. It soon became standard issue in Soviet nations, although many of the nations with export Kalashnikovs retained the larger 7.62×39mm round. In 1995, the People's Republic of China adopted a new 5.8×42mm cartridge to match the modern trend in military ammunition, replacing the previous 7.62x54mmR, 7.62×39mm, and 5.45×39mm round as standard.

Later, even lighter carbine variants of many of these short-barreled assault rifles came to be adopted as the standard infantry weapon. In much modern tactical thinking, only a certain number of soldiers need to retain longer-range weapons, serving as designated marksmen. The rest can carry lighter, shorter-ranged weapons for close quarters combat and suppressive fire. This is basically a more extreme extension of the idea that brought the original assault rifle. Another factor is that with the increasing weight of technology, sighting systems, ballistic armor, etc., the only way to reduce the burden on the modern soldier was to equip them with a smaller, lighter weapon. Also, modern soldiers rely a great deal on vehicles and helicopters to transport them around the battle area, and a longer weapon can be a serious hindrance to entering and exiting these vehicles. Development of lighter assault rifles continued, matched by developments in even lighter carbines. In spite of the short barrels of the new assault rifles, carbine variants like the 5.45×39mm AKS-74U and Colt Commando were being developed for use when mobility was essential and a submachine gun was not sufficiently powerful. The AKS-74U featured an extremely short 8.1-inch (210 mm) barrel which necessitated redesigning and shortening the gas-piston and integrating front sights onto the gas tube; the Colt Commando was a bit longer, at 11.5 inches (290 mm). Neither was adopted as standard issue, although the U.S. did later adopt the somewhat longer M4 carbine, with a 14.5-inch (370 mm) barrel.

== Modern history ==
=== Contemporary military forces ===
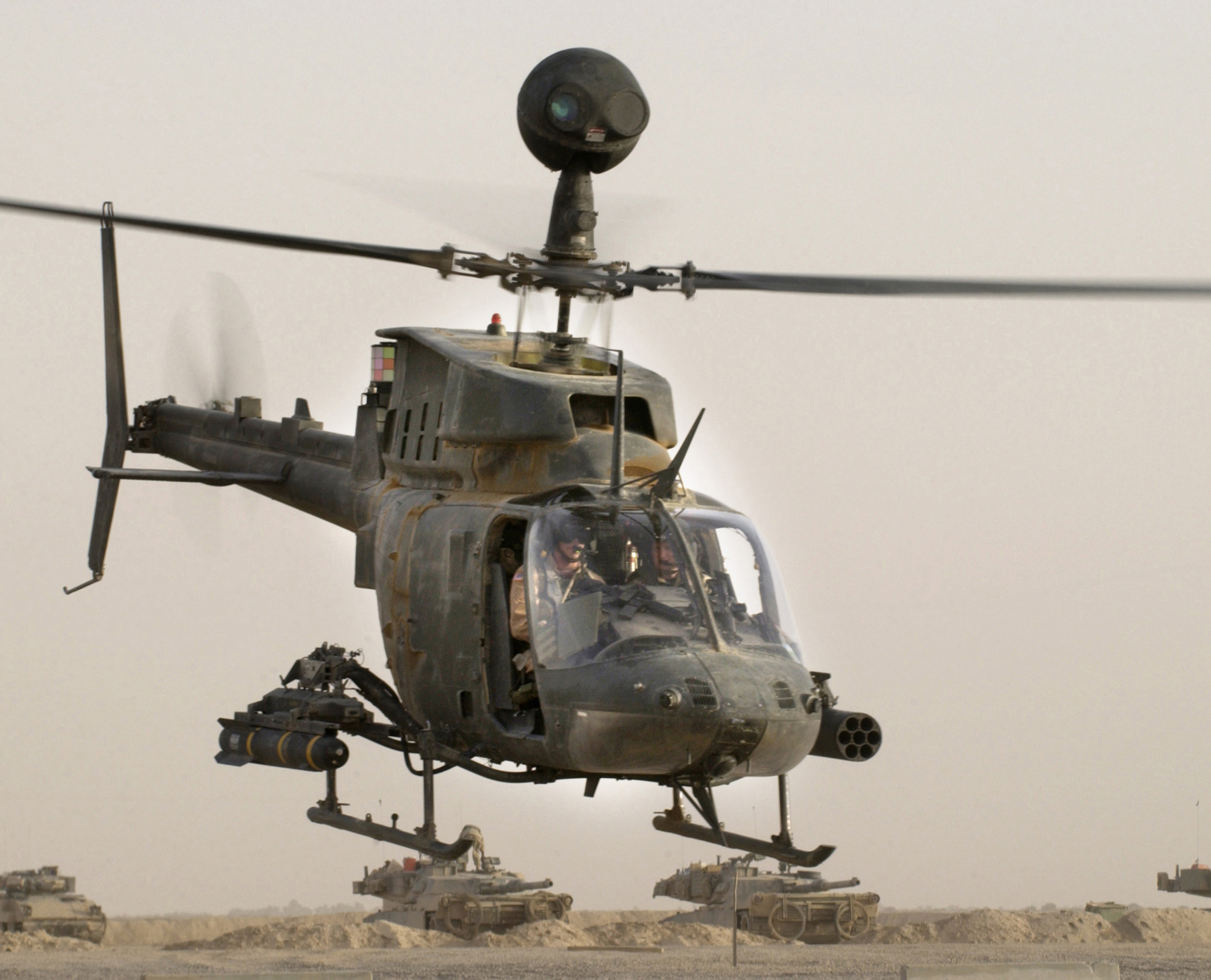
Two M4 carbines stowed ahead of the flight instrument panel of a US Army OH-58D reconnaissance helicopter, over Iraq in 2004

In 1994, the U.S. had adopted the M4 carbine, a derivative of the M16 family which fired the same 5.56mm cartridge but was lighter and shorter (in overall length and barrel length), resulting in marginally reduced range and power, although offering better mobility and lighter weight to offset the weight of equipment and armor that a modern soldier has to carry.

In spite of the benefits of the modern carbine, many armies are experiencing a certain backlash against the universal equipping of soldiers with carbines and lighter rifles in general, and are equipping selected soldiers, usually designated marksmen, with higher-powered rifles. Another problem comes from the loss of muzzle velocity caused by the shorter barrel, which when coupled with the typical small, lightweight bullets, causes effectiveness to be diminished; a 5.56mm gets its lethality from its high velocity, and when fired from the 14.5-inch (370 mm) M4 carbine, its power, penetration, and range are diminished. Thus, there has been a move towards adopting a slightly more powerful cartridge tailored for high performance from both long and short barrels. The U.S. has experimented with a new, slightly larger and heavier caliber such as the 6.5mm Grendel or 6.8mm Remington SPC, which are heavier and thus retain more effectiveness at lower muzzle velocities. This led to the United States Army adopting the M7 rifle in 2023 to replace the M4 carbine in infantry and other front-line units, it is chambered for the 6.8×51mm Common Cartridge (.277 Fury), a round that is based on the 7.62x51mm and is necked down to a .277 in (7.0 mm) caliber bullet.

While the U.S. Army adopted the M4 carbine in 1994, the U.S. Marine Corps retained their 20-inch (510 mm) barrel M16A4 rifles long afterwards, citing the increased range and effectiveness over the carbine version; officers were required to carry an M4 carbine rather than an M9 pistol, as Army officers do. Because the Marine Corps emphasizes "every Marine a rifleman", the lighter carbine was considered a suitable compromise between a rifle and a pistol. Marines with restricted mobility such as vehicle operators, or a greater need for mobility such as squad leaders, were issued M4 carbines. In 2015, the Marine Corps approved the M4 carbine for standard issue to front-line Marines, replacing the M16A4 rifle. The rifles are issued to support troops while the carbines go to the front-line Marines, in a reversal of the traditional roles of "rifles for the front line, carbines for the rear".

=== Special forces ===
Special forces need to perform fast, decisive operations, frequently airborne or boat-mounted. A pistol, though light and quick to operate, is viewed as not having enough power, firepower, or range. A submachine gun has selective fire, but firing a pistol cartridge and having a short barrel and sight radius, it is not accurate or powerful enough at longer ranges. Submachine guns also tend to have poorer armor and cover penetration than rifles and carbines firing rifle ammunition. Consequently, carbines have gained wide acceptance among United States Special Operations Command, United Kingdom Special Forces, and other communities, having relatively lightweight, large magazine capacity, selective fire, and much better range and penetration than a submachine gun.

== Usage ==
The smaller size and relative lighter weight of carbines makes them easier to handle in close-quarter situations such as urban engagements, when deploying from military vehicles, or in any situation where space is confined. The disadvantages of carbines relative to rifles include inferior long-range accuracy and a shorter effective range. These comparisons refer to carbines (short-barreled rifles) of the same power and class as the regular full-sized rifles.

Compared to submachine guns, carbines have a greater effective range and are capable of penetrating helmets and body armor when used with armor-piercing ammunition. However, submachine guns are still used by military special forces and police SWAT teams for close quarters battle because they are "a pistol caliber weapon that's easy to control, and less likely to over-penetrate the target." Also, carbines are harder to maneuver in tight encounters where superior range and stopping power at distance are not great considerations.

Firing the same ammunition as standard-issue rifles or pistols gives carbines the advantage of standardization over those personal defense weapons that require proprietary cartridges.

The modern usage of the term carbine covers much the same scope as it always had, namely lighter weapons (generally rifles) with barrels up to 20 inches (510 mm) in length. These weapons can be considered carbines, while rifles with barrels longer than 20 inches (510 mm) are generally not considered carbines unless specifically named so. Conversely, many rifles have barrels shorter than 20 inches, yet are not considered carbines. The AK series rifles has an almost universal barrel length of 16.3 inches (410 mm), well within carbine territory, yet has always been considered a rifle, perhaps because it was designed as such and not shortened from a longer weapon. Modern carbines use ammunition ranging from that used in light pistols up to powerful rifle cartridges, with the usual exception of high-velocity magnum cartridges. In the more powerful cartridges, the short barrel of a carbine has significant disadvantages in velocity, and the high residual pressure, and frequently still-burning powder and gases, when the bullet exits the barrel results in substantially greater muzzle blast. Flash suppressors are a common, partial solution to this problem, although even the best flash suppressors are hard put to deal with the excess flash from the still-burning powder leaving the short barrel (and they also add several inches to the length of the barrel, diminishing the purpose of having a short barrel in the first place).

== Pistol-caliber carbines ==
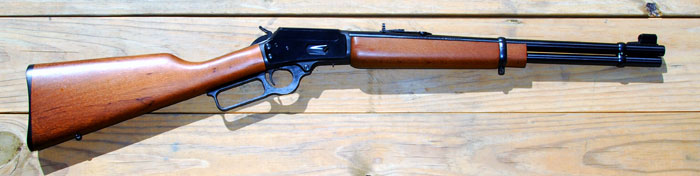
Marlin 1894C .357 Magnum carbine

The typical carbine is the pistol-caliber carbine. These first appeared soon after metallic cartridges became common. These were developed as "companions" to the popular revolvers of the day, firing the same cartridge but allowing more velocity and accuracy than the revolver. These were carried by cowboys, lawmen, and others in the Old West. The classic combination would be a Winchester lever-action carbine and a Colt Single Action Army revolver in .44-40 or .38–40. During the 20th century, this trend continued with more modern and powerful smokeless revolver cartridges, in the form of Winchester and Marlin lever action carbines chambered in .38 Special/.357 Magnum and .44 Special/.44 Magnum.

Modern equivalents include the Ruger PC carbine, which uses the same magazine as the Ruger pistols of the same caliber, and the (discontinued) Marlin Camp carbine, which, in .45 ACP, used M1911 magazines. The Ruger Model 44 and Ruger Deerfield carbine were both carbines chambered in .44 Magnum. The Beretta Cx4 Storm shares magazines with many Beretta pistols and is designed to be complementary to the Beretta Px4 Storm pistol. The Hi-Point 995TS are popular, economical and reliable alternatives to other pistol caliber carbines in the United States, and their magazines can be used in the Hi-Point C-9 pistol. Another example is the Kel-Tec SUB-2000 series chambered in either 9mm Parabellum or .40 S&W, which can be configured to accept Glock, Beretta, S&W, or SIG pistol magazines. The SUB-2000 also has the somewhat unusual (although not unique) ability to fold in half.

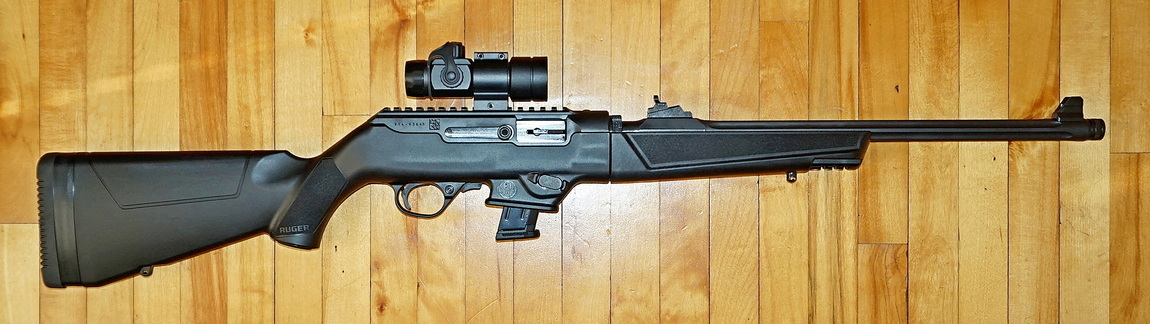
Ruger PC carbine in 9×19mm Parabellum

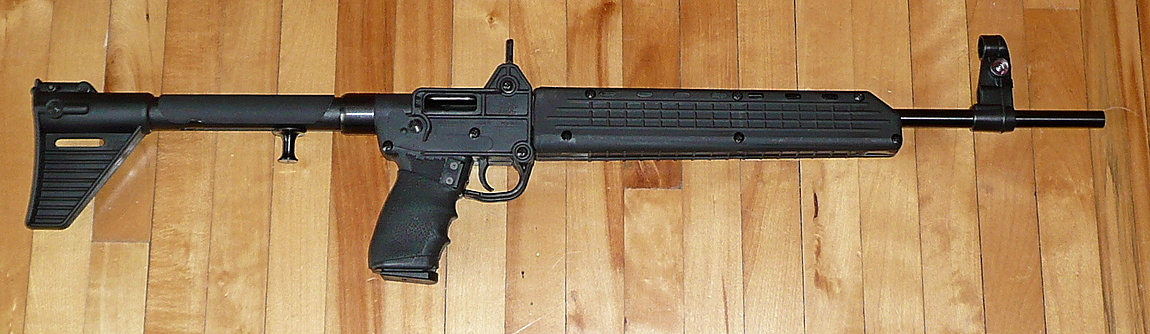
Kel-Tec SUB-2000 carbine in 9×19mm Parabellum

The primary advantage of a carbine over a pistol using the same ammunition is controllability. The combination of firing from the shoulder, longer sight-radius, three points of contact (firing hand, support hand, and shoulder), and precision offer a significantly more user-friendly platform. Many carbines have the ability to mount optics, lights and lasers to accessory rails, which make target acquisition and engagement much easier.

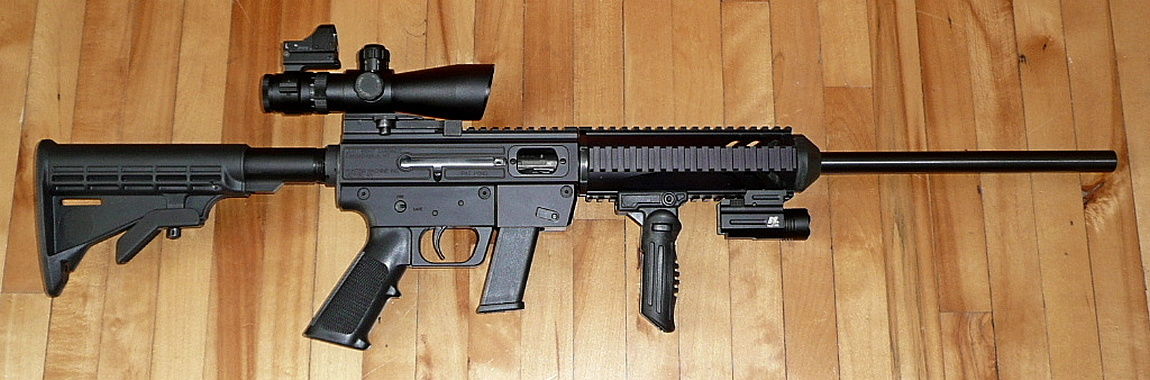
Just Right Carbines (JC carbine) in 9×19mm Parabellum with 3–9 X 42mm scope and red dot sight

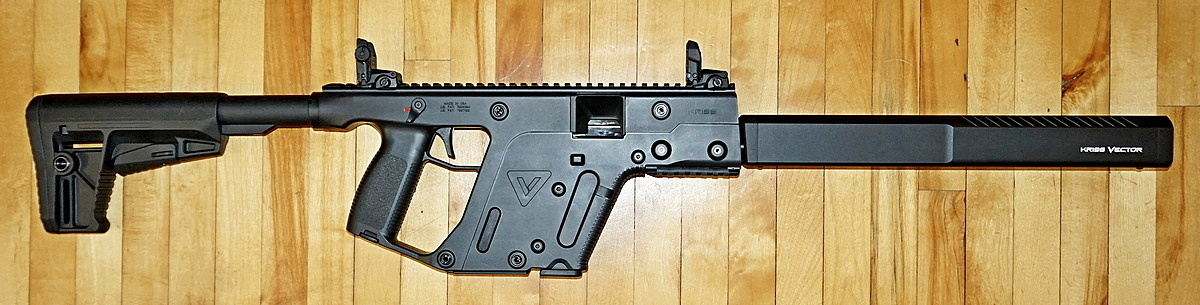
KRISS Vector CRB 18.6-inch barrel (Canadian version)

The longer barrel can offer increased velocity and, with it, greater energy and effective range due to the propellant having more time to burn. However, loss in bullet velocity can happen where the propellant is used before the bullet reaches the muzzle, combined with the friction from the barrel on the bullet. As long guns, pistol-caliber carbines may be less legally restricted than handguns in some jurisdictions. Compared to carbines chambered in intermediate or rifle calibers, such as .223 Remington and 7.62×54mmR, pistol-caliber carbines generally experience less of an increase in external ballistic properties as a result of the propellant. The drawback is that one loses the primary benefits of a handgun, i.e. portability and concealability, resulting in a weapon almost the size of, but less accurate than, a long-gun, but not much more powerful than a pistol. The Flint River Armory CSA45 was designed to handle higher pressure large caliber handgun cartridges and uses a gas operation to achieve this.

Also widely produced are semi-automatic and typically longer-barreled derivatives of select-fire submachine guns, such as the FN PS90, HK USC, Spectre M4, KRISS Vector, Thompson carbine, CZ Scorpion S1 carbine, and the Uzi carbine. To be sold legally in many countries, the barrel must meet a minimum length (16 inches (410 mm) in the United States). So the original submachine gun is given a legal-length barrel and made into a semi-automatic firearm, transforming it into a carbine. Though less common, pistol-caliber conversions of centerfire rifles like the AR-15 are commercially available.

=== Land defence pistol ===
During the Apartheid era of South Africa and the Rhodesian Bush War/South African Border War, a semi-automatic-only pistol-calibre carbine based on submachine guns existed for civilian personal protection as land defence pistols (LDP). Known examples were the Bell & White 84, BHS Rhogun, Cobra Mk1, GM-16, Kommando LDP, Northwood R-76, Paramax, Sanna 77 and TS III.

=== Shoulder-stocked handgun ===
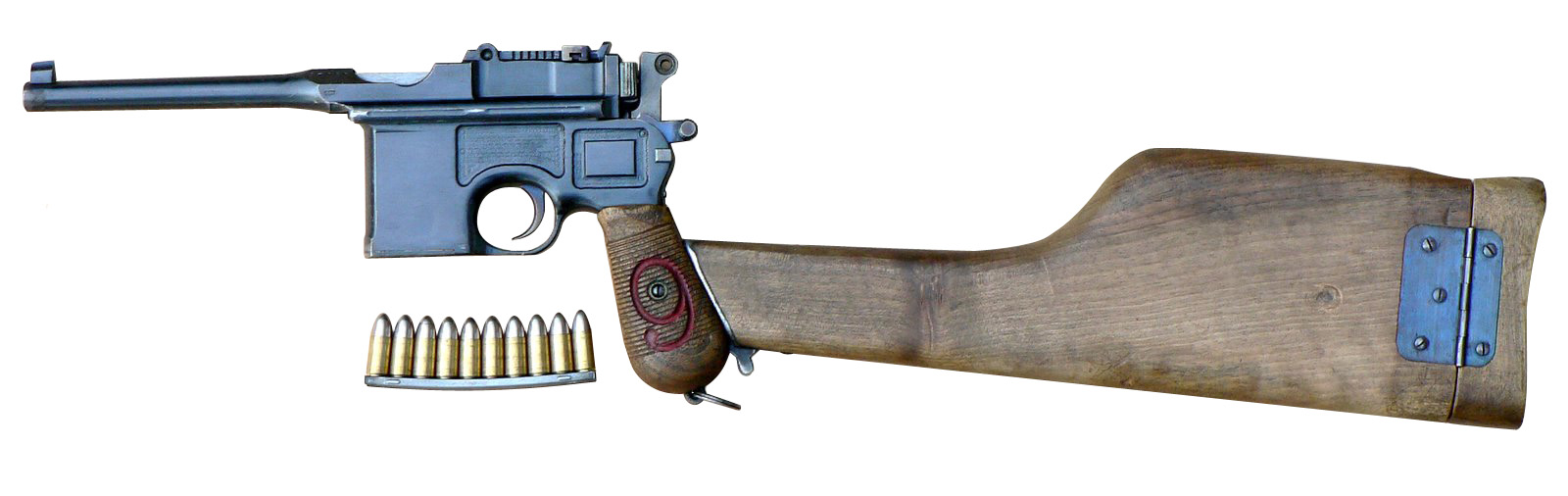
Mauser C96 "Red 9" variant with attached shoulder-stock

Some handguns used to come from the factory with mounting lugs for a shoulder stock, notably including the "Broomhandle" Mauser C96, Luger P.08, and Browning Hi-Power. In the case of the first two, the pistol could come with a hollow wooden stock that doubled as a holster.

Carbine conversion kits are commercially available for many other pistols, including M1911, and most Glocks. These can either be simple shoulder stocks fitted to a pistol or full carbine conversion kits, which are at least 26 in (660 mm) long and replace the pistol's barrel with one at least 16 in (410 mm) long for compliance with the United States law. In the United States, fitting a shoulder stock to a handgun with a barrel less than 16 inches (410 mm) long possibly turns said firearm into a short-barreled rifle, which may be in violation of the National Firearms Act; this is currently being adjudicated by the courts.

== Legal issues ==
=== United States ===
Under the National Firearms Act, a firearm with a shoulder stock — or a firearm originally manufactured as a rifle — with a barrel less than 16 in (410 mm) in length, or having an overall length (OAL) of less than 26 in (660 mm) (regardless of barrel length) is classified as a Short-barreled rifle (SBR); possession of an unregistered SBR (or any NFA firearm) is a felony punishable by a maximum sentence of 10 years in federal prison, it is also a felony under some state's laws. Short-barreled rifles are restricted similarly to short-barreled shotguns (SBS) —shotguns with a buttstock & barrel length less than 18 in (460 mm) or a OAL under 26 in — these weapons are required to be registered and require a $200 tax paid prior to manufacture or transfer; as of 2026, the manufacturing and transfer tax payment requirement for SBRs, SBSs, & AOWs, has been removed. Because of this, firearms with barrels of less than 16 in (410 mm) and a shoulder stock are uncommon. A list of firearms not covered by the NFA due to their antique status may be found here or due to their Curio and Relic status may be found here; these lists includes a number of carbines with barrels less than the minimum legal length and firearms that are "primarily collector's items and are not likely to be used as weapons and, therefore, are excluded from the provisions of the National Firearms Act." Machine guns, as their own class of firearm, are not subject to requirements of other class firearms.

Distinct from simple shoulder stock kits, full carbine conversion kits are not classified as short-barreled rifles. By replacing the pistol barrel with one at least 16 in (410 mm) in length and having an overall length of at least 26 in (660 mm), a carbine converted pistol may be treated as a standard rifle under Title I of the Gun Control Act of 1968 (GCA). However, certain "Broomhandle" Mauser C96, Luger, and Browning Hi-Power Curio & Relic pistols with their originally issued stock attached only may retain their pistol classification.

Carbines without a stock and not originally manufactured as a rifle are not classified as rifles or short barreled rifles. A carbine manufactured under 26 in (660 mm) in length without a forward vertical grip will be a pistol and, state law notwithstanding, can be carried concealed without creating an unregistered Any Other Weapon (AOW); an example of this type of carbine is an AR-15–style pistol. A nearly identical carbine with an overall length of 26 in (660 mm) or greater is simply an unclassified firearm under Title I of the Gun Control Act of 1968, as the AOW catch-all only applies to firearms under 26 in (660 mm) or that are disguised as another object (like a cane gun). However, adding a vertical foregrip to a pistol — including a carbine classified as a pistol — would make it an illegal unregistered AOW, to add one legally requires registering the pistol/carbine with the ATF using a Form 1 application, or the quicker way is to take the pistol to a licensed NFA manufacturer that has a Type 07 or Type 10 Federal Firearms License with a class 2 SOT status, who can install and properly register it. Additionally, a modification to a carbine classified as a pistol intending to allow it to be fired from the shoulder (adding a buttstock) and bypass the regulation of short-barreled rifles is considered the unlawful possession and manufacture of an unregistered short-barreled rifle, adding a buttstock to a pistol or carbine requires it to be registered as an SBR using the same process described for making a pistol into an AOW.

In some historical cases, the term machine carbine was the official title for submachine guns, such as the British Sten and Australian Owen guns. The semiautomatic-only version of the Sterling submachine gun was also officially called a carbine. The original Sterling semi-auto would be classed a short-barrel rifle under the U.S. National Firearms Act, but fully legal long-barrel versions of the Sterling have been made for the U.S. collector market.

== See also ==
- List of carbines
- Dual-purpose handgun/rifle cartridges
