= Ruger Deerfield carbine =

- Type: Centerfire semi-automatic rifle
- Place of origin: United States

Production history
- Manufacturer: Sturm, Ruger & Company, Inc.
- Produced: 2000–2006

Specifications
- Mass: 6.25 lb (2.83 kg)
- Length: 37 in (94 cm)
- Barrel length: 18.5 in (470 mm)
- Cartridge: .44 Magnum
- Action: Gas-operated, rotating bolt
- Feed system: 4-round rotary box magazine
- Sights: Iron adjustable aperture

The Deerfield carbine or Model 99/44 is a .44 Magnum semi-automatic rifle produced by Sturm, Ruger & Co. It uses a rotating-bolt short-stroke gas piston. It was introduced in 2000 and discontinued in 2006.

The Deerfield carbine replaced the earlier Ruger Model 44 Deerstalker rifle first produced in 1961 and dropped from the Ruger lineup in 1985 due to high production cost. The Deerfield is a brand new design and has little in common with the Model 44. While the Model 44 featured a solid-topped receiver, the modern Deerfield carbine has an open-top design more resembling the M1 carbine, which is stronger and easier to make. The Deerfield also uses a rotary magazine similar to that used on Ruger's .22 LR 10/22 rifle, whereas the Model 44 was fed via a fixed four-shot tubular magazine.

A 4-round rotary magazine (right) along with an aftermarket 10-round box magazine (left)
