= Ruger Model 44 =

- A scoped Ruger 44 Carbine
- Type: Semi-automatic rifle
- Place of origin: United States

Production history
- Designer: William B. Ruger
- Designed: 1960
- Manufacturer: Sturm, Ruger & Co.
- Unit cost: $108 (equivalent to $1,175 in 2025) (1960)
- Produced: 1960–1985
- No. built: Over 250,000
- Variants: RS, International, Sporter, 25th Anniversary

Specifications
- Mass: 5.75 lb (2.6 kg)
- Length: 36.75 in (933 mm)
- Barrel length: 18.25 in (464 mm)
- Cartridge: .44 Remington Magnum
- Action: Gas-operated, rotating bolt
- Feed system: 4-round tubular magazine
- Sights: Folding rear leaf sight, gold bead front sight

The Ruger Model 44 is a semi-automatic rifle chambered in .44 Remington Magnum designed and manufactured by American firearm company Sturm, Ruger & Co. It uses a four-round tubular magazine and was produced from 1961 to 1985.

== History ==
Designed as a close range carbine for deer hunting in dense woods, Ruger released the Model 44 Carbine in 1961 as the "Deerstalker", a moniker it used until 1962 after which a lawsuit brought by the Ithaca Gun Company prohibited them from doing so. The design influenced the smaller and more popular Ruger 10/22 model chambered in .22 LR that would debut in 1964. The rifle was discontinued in 1985 due to high production costs. Ruger does not offer any parts support for the Model 44.

The Ruger Model 44 was replaced by the Ruger Deerfield carbine introduced in 2000 and produced until 2006. The Deerfield is a brand new design and has little in common with the Model 44. While the Model 44 featured a solid-topped receiver, the modern Deerfield carbine has an open-top design more resembling the M1 Carbine, which offered increased strength and lower production costs. The Deerfield uses a rotary magazine similar to that used on Ruger's .22 LR 10/22 rifle.

== Design ==
The standard model featured a walnut stock and a barrel band similar to the Ruger 10/22 and the M1 Carbine, but using a solid top receiver. The front sight was a gold bead and the rear sight was a folding leaf-type. The receiver was drilled and tapped for scope mounts. The rifle was fed via a four round tubular magazine.

The chief complaint of the rifle was that the gas ports quickly fouled when using lead ammunition. This became less of an issue as manufacturers of .44 Magnum ammunition offered jacketed rounds instead of traditional lead.

Ruger offered several variants including the RS model that had factory sling swivels and a rear peep sight close to the rear receiver lug. The International Model was similar, but lacked the rear peep sight and had a Mannlicher-type stock. The Sporter was the same, but made use of a Monte-Carlo style of stock. These three variants were dropped from production in 1971. In the final year of production, Ruger offered a "25th Anniversary Edition" that featured a Ruger medallion embedded in the stock.

== Images ==
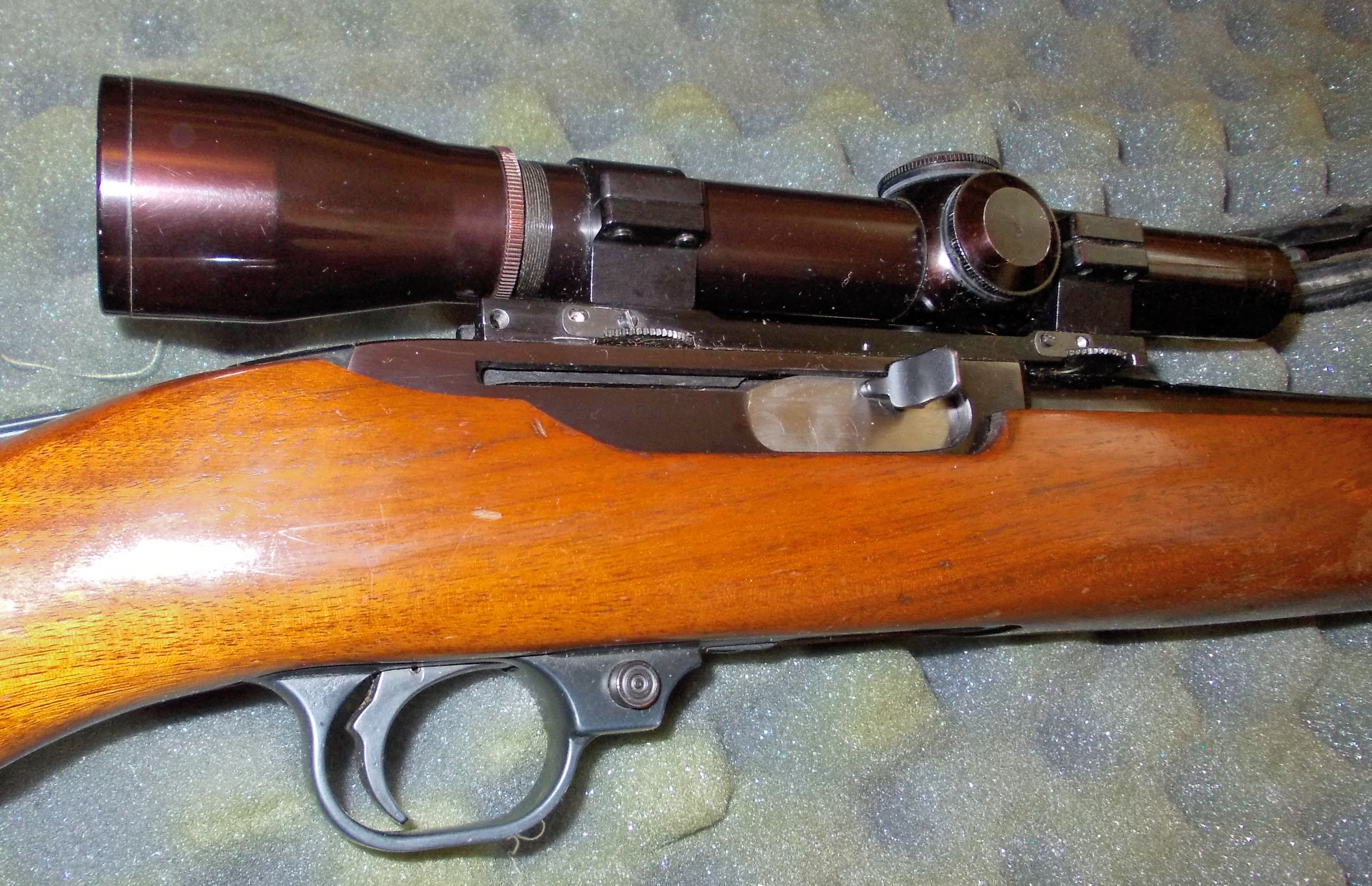
The right side of the Ruger Deerstalker 44 Magnum semi-auto rifle.

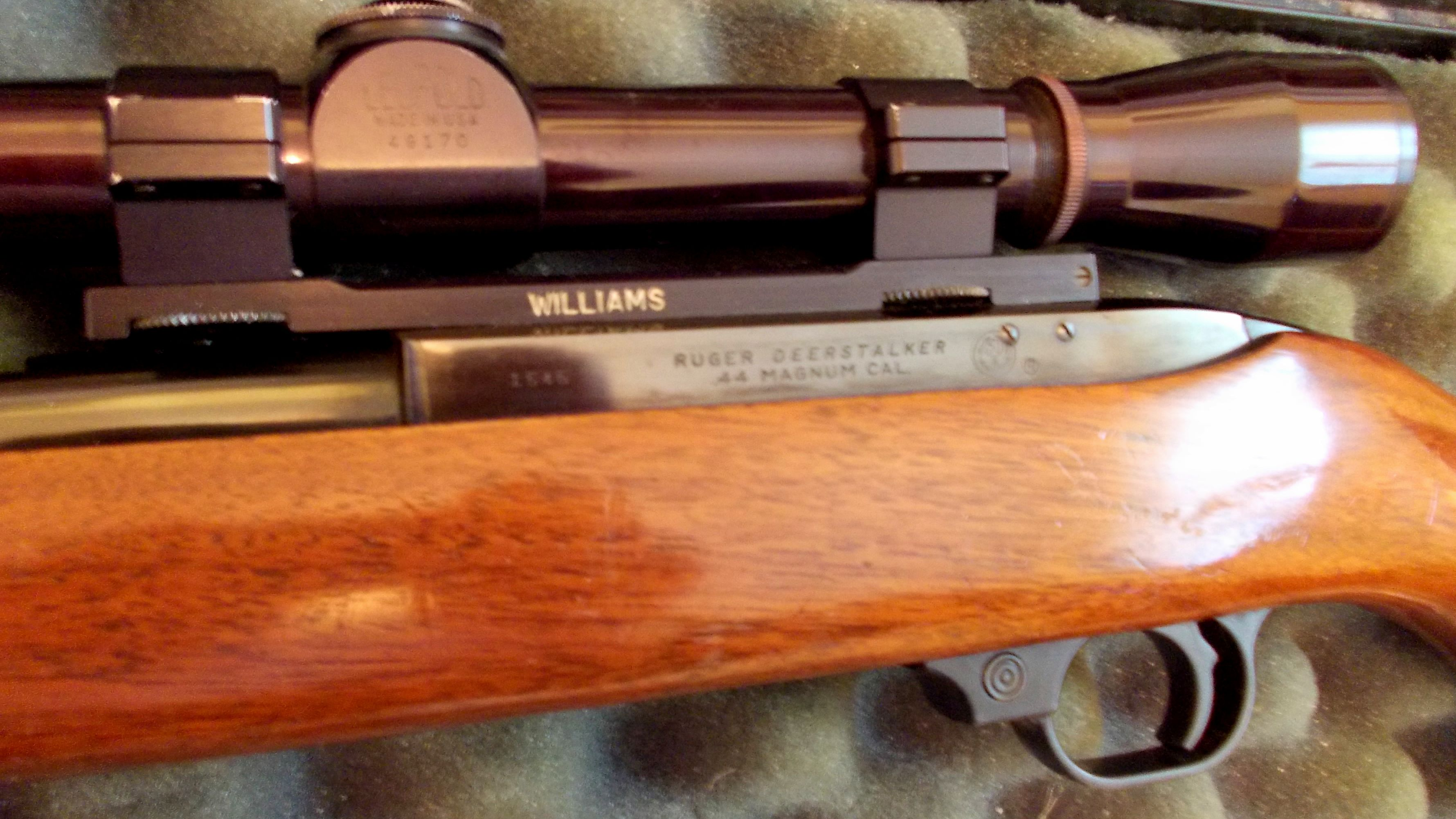
The left side of the Ruger Deerstalker 44 Magnum semi-auto rifle, bearing the pre-lawsuit brand name, and the low 1000s serial number.

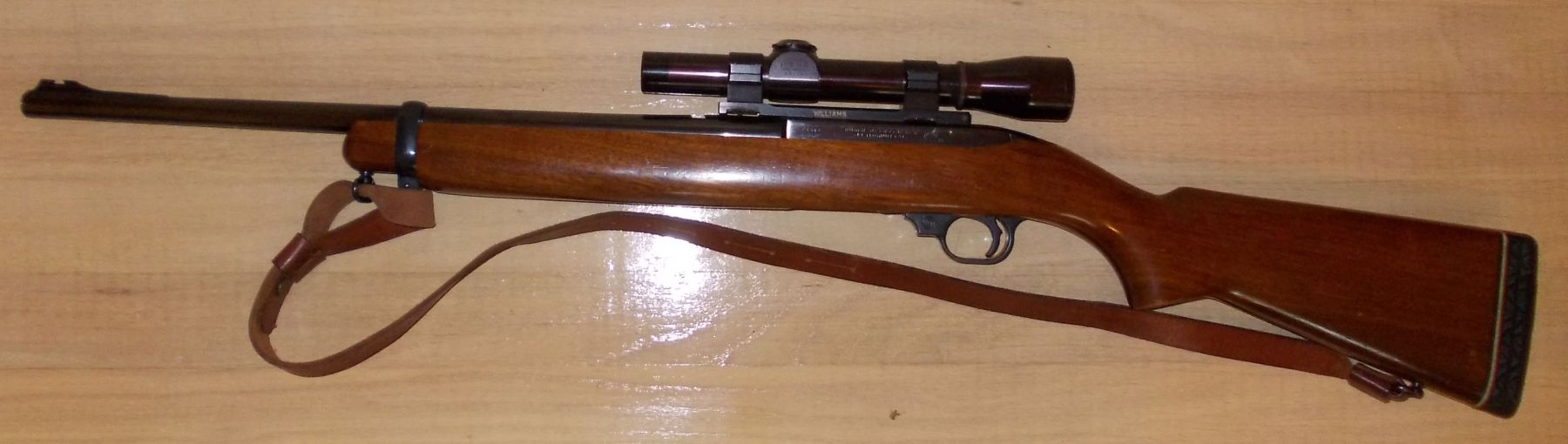
Ruger Model 44 carbine
