= .44 Magnum =

Revolver cartridge designed by Elmer Keith and Smith & Wesson (S&W)

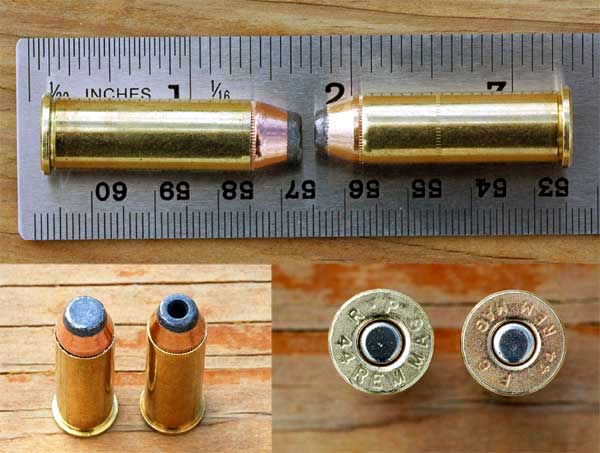
- .44 Magnum cartridge
- Type: Handgun, Carbine
- Place of origin: United States

Production history
- Designer: Elmer Keith; Smith & Wesson
- Designed: 1950s
- Manufacturer: Remington Arms
- Produced: January 19, 1956–present

Specifications
- Parent case: .44 Smith & Wesson Special
- Case type: Rimmed, straight
- Bullet diameter: .429 in (10.9 mm)
- Land diameter: .417 in (10.6 mm)
- Neck diameter: .457 in (11.6 mm)
- Base diameter: .457 in (11.6 mm)
- Rim diameter: .514 in (13.1 mm)
- Rim thickness: .060 in (1.5 mm)
- Case length: 1.285 in (32.6 mm)
- Overall length: 1.61 in (41 mm)
- Case capacity: 37.9 gr H_{2}O (2.46 cm^{3})
- Primer type: Large pistol
- Maximum pressure (CIP): 40,600 psi (280 MPa)
- Maximum pressure (SAAMI): 36,000 psi (250 MPa)

Ballistic performance
Bullet mass/type	Velocity	Energy
240 gr (16 g) SJHP Remington	1,180 ft/s (360 m/s)	741 ft⋅lbf (1,005 J)
240 gr (16 g) JHP Cor-Bon	1,475 ft/s (450 m/s)	1,160 ft⋅lbf (1,570 J)
270 gr (17 g) LFN GC Buffalo bore heavy	1,550 ft/s (470 m/s)	1,440 ft⋅lbf (1,950 J)
300 gr (19 g) JSP Cor-Bon	1,250 ft/s (380 m/s)	1,041 ft⋅lbf (1,411 J)
340 gr (22 g) LFN +P+ Buffalo bore heavy (+P+ used in special guns only)	1,425 ft/s (434 m/s)	1,533 ft⋅lbf (2,078 J)
- Test barrel length: 7.5 in (190 mm) [*6.5 in (170 mm)] Source: Ballistics 101

The .44 Remington Magnum, also known as .44 Magnum or 10.9x33mmR (as it is known in unofficial metric designation), is a rimmed, large-bore cartridge originally designed for revolvers and quickly adopted for carbines and rifles. Despite the ".44" designation, guns chambered for the .44 Magnum round, its parent case, the .44 Special, and the .44 Special's parent case, the .44 Russian all use 0.429 in (10.9 mm) diameter bullets. The .44 Magnum is based on the .44 Special case but lengthened and loaded to higher pressures for greater velocity and energy.

Famously called "the most powerful handgun [cartridge] in the world" by the title character in Dirty Harry, the .44 Magnum has since been eclipsed in power by the .454 Casull, .500 S&W Magnum, and .500 Bushwhacker; nevertheless, due in part to its more manageable recoil, it has remained one of the most popular commercial large-bore magnum cartridges.

== Origin ==
The .44 Magnum cartridge was the result of years of tuned handloading of the .44 Special. In the early 20th century, experimenters loaded the .44 Special and other large-bore handgun cartridges with heavy bullets and higher than normal powder charges to achieve superior ballistics and better hunting performance. One of these hand-loaders was Elmer Keith, a prominent writer and outdoorsman of the 20th century.

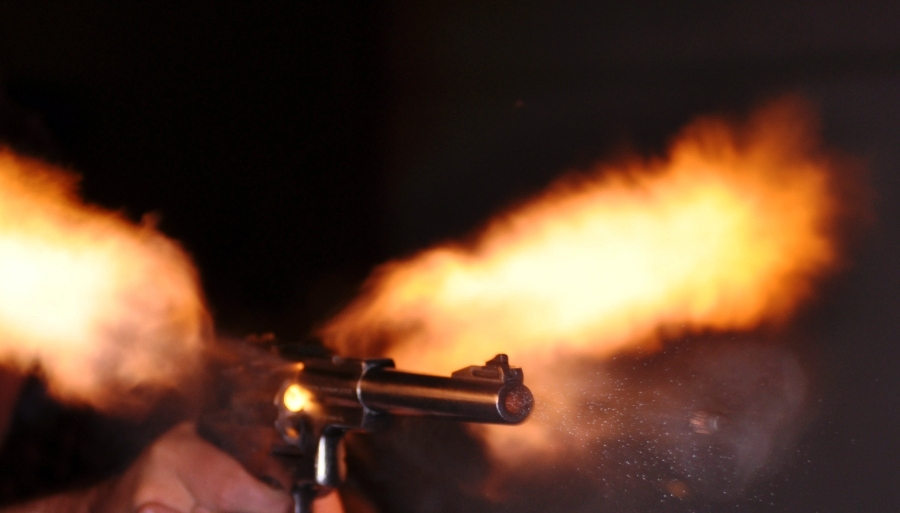
A high-speed photograph of a .44 Magnum revolver taken using an air-gap flash, clearly showing the bullet in flight after having exited the barrel of the revolver..

Keith settled on the .44 Special cartridge as the basis for his experimentation, rather than the larger .45 Colt. At the time, the selection of .44 caliber projectiles for hand-loaders was more varied, and the .44 Special's brass was thicker and stronger than the dated .45 Colt case. Also, the .44 Special case was smaller in diameter than the .45 Colt case. In revolvers of the same cylinder size, this meant that the .44 caliber revolvers had thicker, and thus stronger, cylinder walls than the .45. This allowed higher pressures to be used with less risk of a cylinder failure.

Keith and his associates successfully lobbied Smith & Wesson and Remington to produce a commercial version of this new high-pressure loading, along with revolvers chambered for it. Smith & Wesson's first .44 Magnum revolver, the precursor to the Model 29, was built on December 15, 1955, and the gun was announced to the public on January 19, 1956 for a price of US$140 (roughly $1,700 today). Julian Hatcher (technical editor of American Rifleman) and Keith received two of the first production models. Hatcher's review of the new Smith & Wesson revolver and the .44 Magnum cartridge appeared in the March 1956 issue of the magazine. Smith & Wesson produced 3,100 of these revolvers in 1956.

By the summer of 1956, Sturm, Ruger became aware of this project and began work on a single action Blackhawk revolver for the new .44 Magnum cartridge. There is a popular rumor that a Ruger employee found a cartridge case marked ".44 Remington Magnum" and took it to Bill Ruger, while another says a Remington employee provided Ruger with early samples of the ammunition. Ruger began shipping their new revolver in late November 1956.

The .44 Magnum case is slightly longer than the .44 Special case. This alteration was not primarily intended to increase the propellant capacity of the cartridge, but rather to prevent the far higher pressure round from being chambered in older, weaker .44 Special firearms and potentially causing injury or death to shooters.

The .44 Magnum was an immediate commercial success. The direct descendants of the S&W Model 29 and the .44 Magnum Ruger Blackhawks are still in production, and have been joined by numerous other makes and models of .44 Magnum revolvers and even a handful of semi-automatic models, the first being produced in the 1960s. The film Dirty Harry, prominently featuring the S&W M29 shooting .44 Special ammo, contributed to that model's popularity.

Although improved modern alloys and manufacturing techniques have allowed even stronger cylinders to be made, leading to larger and more powerful cartridges such as the .454 Casull and .480 Ruger in revolvers the same size as a .44 Magnum, the .44 Magnum is still considered an exceptional weapon. In 2006, to commemorate the 50th anniversary of the .44 Magnum, Ruger introduced a special 50th anniversary Blackhawk revolver, in the "Flattop" style.

== Technical specifications ==
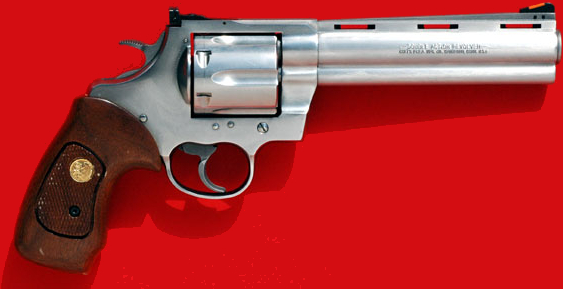
.44 Magnum Colt Anaconda

The .44 Magnum fires a large, heavy bullet at a high velocity for a handgun. In its full-powered form, it produces so much recoil and muzzle blast that it is generally considered to be unsuitable for use as a police weapon. Rapid fire is difficult and strenuous on the user's hands, especially for shooters of smaller build.

Although marketed as a .44 caliber, the .44 Magnum and its parent .44 Special are actually .429-.430 caliber. The .44 designation is a carryover from the early measurements of heeled bullets used in the late 19th century. In those times, bullet diameter typically matched the external dimension of its respective cartridge, not the interior of the round. After the .44 Russian was developed, the forefather of the .44 Special and thus the .44 Magnum, the measurement of bullet caliber was taken from inside of the cartridge, resulting in .429 caliber.

Some gun styles are more comfortable to use when shooting this caliber. Many shooters find the rounded grip shape of the single action better for handling heavy recoil than the grip shape of double-action revolvers, which have a shoulder on top of the grip. Many shooters consider the ideal type of grip for heavy recoiling guns to be the longer "Bisley" style single action grip, and it can be found on single actions from Ruger (models marked "Bisley") and Freedom Arms, as well as many custom makers.

=== Dual-purpose use ===
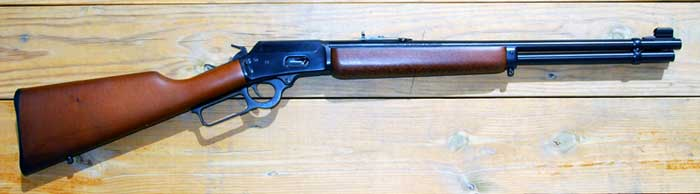
A .44 Magnum Marlin Model 1894 carbine

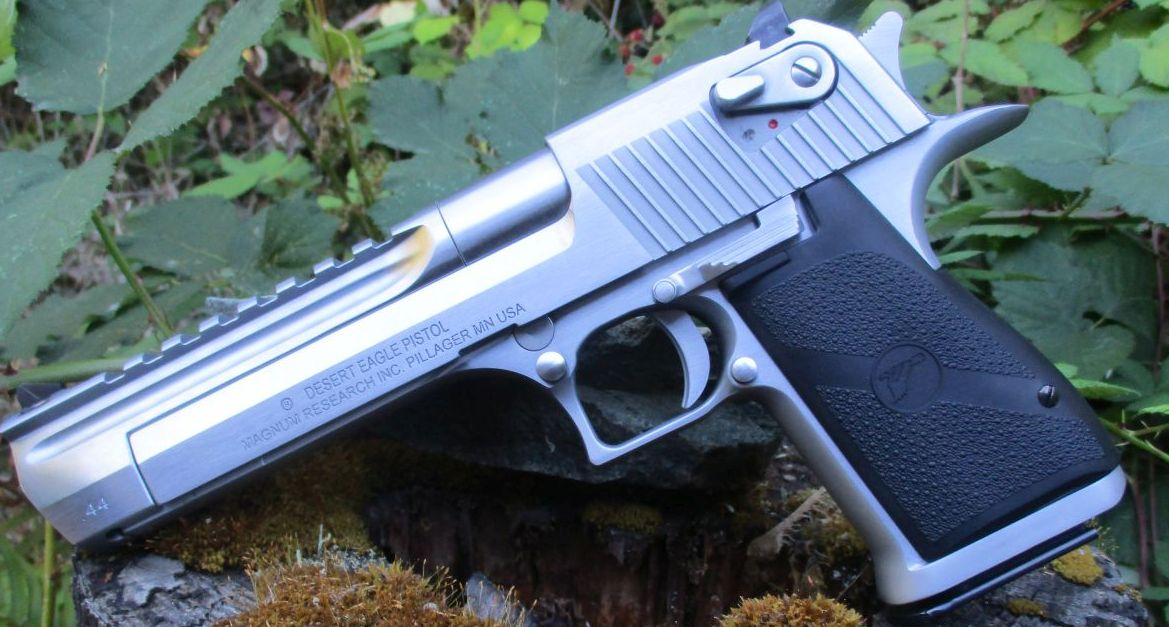
A Desert Eagle semiautomatic pistol in .44 Magnum.

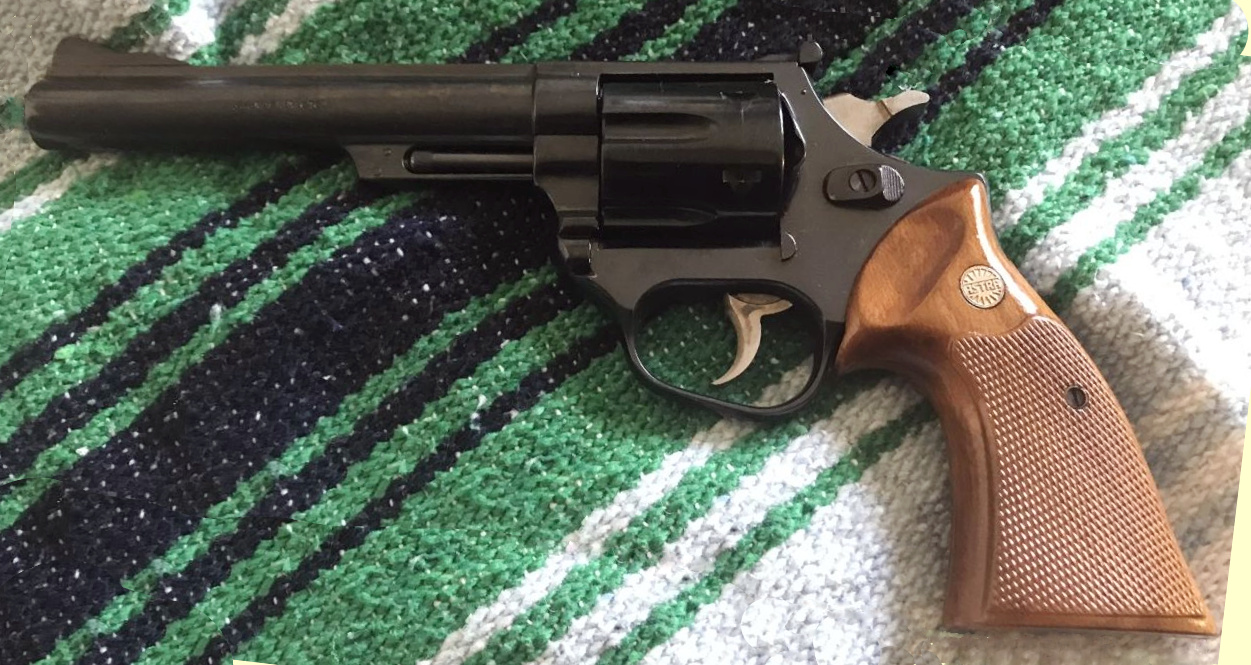
A Spanish-made Astra Model 44 revolver in .44 Magnum.

The concept of a dual-purpose handgun/rifle cartridge has been popular since the Old West, with cartridges like the .44-40 Winchester, whose "high-speed" rifle loadings were precursors to magnum loads. Other dual-use rounds were the .32-20 Winchester and the .38-40 Winchester.

Ruger introduced its first long gun, a semi-automatic carbine called the Ruger Model 44 chambered for .44 Magnum, in 1959. Marlin followed soon after with the lever action Model 1894 in .44 Magnum.

Some past dual-purpose cartridges, like the .44-40 Winchester, gave their manufacturers trouble when people loaded the "high-speed" versions designed for rifles into handguns. Since the .44 Magnum was designed from the start as a revolver cartridge, there are no such issues, and SAAMI-compliant ammunition fires from any handguns or rifles chambered for the .44 Magnum.

For a handgun cartridge, the bolt thrust is considerable at C.I.P. conform maximum loads and an important factor in weapons design. The greater the bolt thrust, the stronger the locking mechanism has to be to withstand it.

As a rifle or carbine cartridge, the .44 Magnum is sufficiently powerful for medium-sized game, yet fits easily into a compact, lightweight package. In 1961, Ruger introduced their .44 carbine, the first .44 Magnum carbine. The lever-action Marlin Model 1894, and many other firearms are currently available in this caliber. With significantly longer barrels than revolvers and no cylinder gap (except in revolving rifles), carbines will generate a significantly higher velocity than a revolver loaded with the same ammunition. Tests with various ammunition in the Ruger Deerfield yielded a 100 yd (91 m) velocity of over 1,300 ft/s (400 m/s) with a 240-grain (16 g) bullet, comparable to the muzzle velocity out of a revolver. Loads using slow-burning powders maximize performance in both short and long barrels, with one published load generating 1,500 ft/s (460 m/s) from a revolver, and 1,625 ft/s (495 m/s) from a carbine with a 240-grain (16 g) bullet.

=== Suitable game ===
The .44 Magnum is well suited to kill animals up to elk size. With precise shot placement and deep-penetrating cartridges, it has even been used to kill the largest of game, including Cape Buffalo. Publisher Robert E. Petersen killed a record-setting polar bear with a Smith & Wesson Model 29 .44 Magnum. It has even been used to kill elephants with success.

In addition to beating the ballistics of the old .44-40 rifle loads, long considered a top deer cartridge, the heavy, flat-point bullets typically used in the .44 Magnum have an additional advantage. Tests performed where bullets are shot through light cover, intended to represent twigs and brush, have shown that the high-velocity, lightweight, thin-jacketed, pointed bullets used by most hunting cartridges today are easily deflected by contact with the brush. The ideal bullets for penetrating brush with minimal deflection are heavy, flat-point bullets at moderate velocities.

=== Range ===
The .44 Magnum is quite accurate, with models from Colt, Smith & Wesson, and Ruger producing bullet groups of 3 to 4 inches (7.6 to 10.2 centimetres) at 50 yards (46 m), with most ammunition. The limiting factor of the .44 Magnum cartridge is not terminal ballistics. When fired from a 6 in (152 mm) revolver, a typically loaded .44 Magnum 240 gr (16 g) bullet will have more impact energy at 150 yd (137 m) than a 246 gr (15.9 g) .44 Special has at the muzzle, when fired from the same weapon. When loaded with a heavy, non-expanding bullet, the .44 Magnum will easily shoot through large game such as elk and even bison.

The limiting factor is the bullet's trajectory: the best hunting bullets are heavy, so they are relatively slow. This means the projectile's trajectory will drop significantly at ranges beyond 100 yards (91 m); there will be virtually zero significant drop at 50 yd (46 m), so the gun's aimed "line of sight" can meet the "bullet's trajectory" at the same point. When drop-out at 100 yd (91 m) is about 2 inches (5.1 centimetres), the drop-out at 150 yards (137 m) is more than 8 inches (20 centimetres); with a 100 yd (91 m) zero drop-out, the drop-out at 150 yd (137 m) will still measure more than 6 inches (15 centimetres). Experts limit hunting ranges to 100 yards (91 m) when shooting .44 Magnum cartridges, less if practical accuracy requires it.

== In popular culture ==
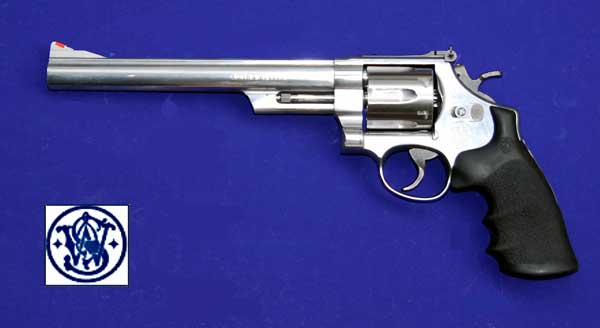
Smith & Wesson Model 629 with an 8 in (200 mm) barrel.

The .44 Magnum remained mildly popular among shooters for many years after its introduction, but did not come to the attention of the general public until 1971 when it was prominently featured in the American feature film Dirty Harry starring Clint Eastwood. In one of the classic lines in cinema, title character "Dirty" Harry Callahan describes his Smith & Wesson Model 29 as "the most powerful handgun in the world". Although the more powerful .454 Casull wildcat cartridge was announced in 1959, the .44 Magnum was the most powerful production cartridge until the 1980s when the first production .454 Casull revolver was produced.

A .44 Magnum is one of the guns that Robert De Niro purchases from a shady seller in Taxi Driver.

Demand for the Model 29 increased so much that they were selling for up to three times the suggested retail price. When the Model 29 could not be obtained, customers sought other handguns chambered in this caliber, such as the Ruger Redhawk.

== See also ==
- 10 mm caliber
- .357 Magnum, the first "magnum" cartridge and the immediate predecessor of the .44 Magnum
- .41 Remington Magnum, developed as an intermediate between the .357 Magnum and .44 Magnum
- .44 AMP
- .445 SuperMag
- .44 AutoMag
- LAR Grizzly Win Mag
- Table of handgun and rifle cartridges
