= Ruger 10/22 =

Semi-automatic rifle by Sturm, Ruger & Co.

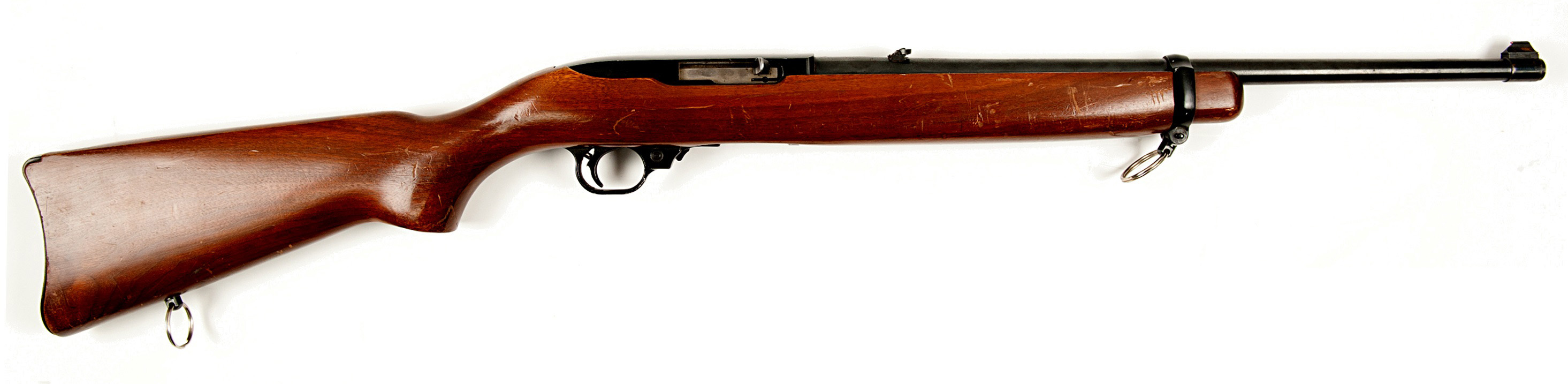
- Ruger 10/22
- Type: Semi-automatic rifle
- Place of origin: United States

Service history
- Used by: Israel Defense Forces
- Wars: Israeli–Palestinian conflict

Production history
- Designer: William B. Ruger; Harry H. Sefried II
- Designed: 1964
- Manufacturer: Sturm, Ruger & Co.
- Unit cost: $54.50 (1965)
- Produced: 1964–present
- No. built: over 7 million (2015)
- Variants: See Variants

Specifications (Standard 10/22 carbine)
- Mass: 5 lb (2.3 kg)
- Length: 37 in (940 mm)
- Barrel length: 18.5 in (470 mm)
- Cartridge: .22 Long Rifle (10/22); .22 Magnum (10/22 Magnum); .17 HMR (10/17 Magnum)
- Action: Semi-automatic
- Feed system: 10-round rotary or 15- and 25-round box magazine (10/22); 9-round rotary or 15-round box magazine (10/22 Magnum and 10/17 Magnum)

The Ruger 10/22 is a series of semi-automatic rifles produced by American firearm manufacturer Sturm, Ruger & Co., chambered for the .22 Long Rifle rimfire cartridge. It uses a patented 10-round rotary magazine, though higher capacity box magazines are also available. The standard carbine version of the Ruger 10/22 has been in production continuously since 1964, making it one of the most successful rimfire rifle designs in history, with numerous third party manufacturers making parts and accessories for upgrading and customization. The 10/22's aftermarket is so prolific that a complete 10/22 can be built without using any Ruger-made components.

A magnum version of the 10/22, known as the 10/22 Magnum, chambered for the .22 WMR cartridge, was made from 1998 to 2006. A .17 HMR version, the 10/17 Magnum, was announced in 2004, but it was only listed in their catalog from 2004 to 2005.

== Design ==
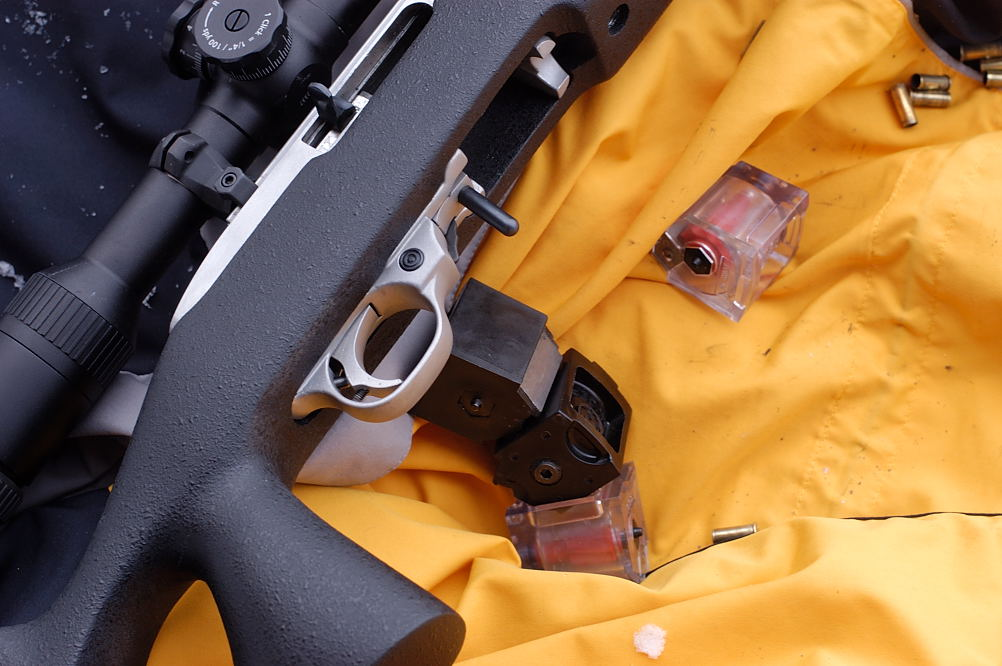
Ruger 10/22 highly customized by Clark Custom Guns. Clear/red magazines are the 40th anniversary edition.

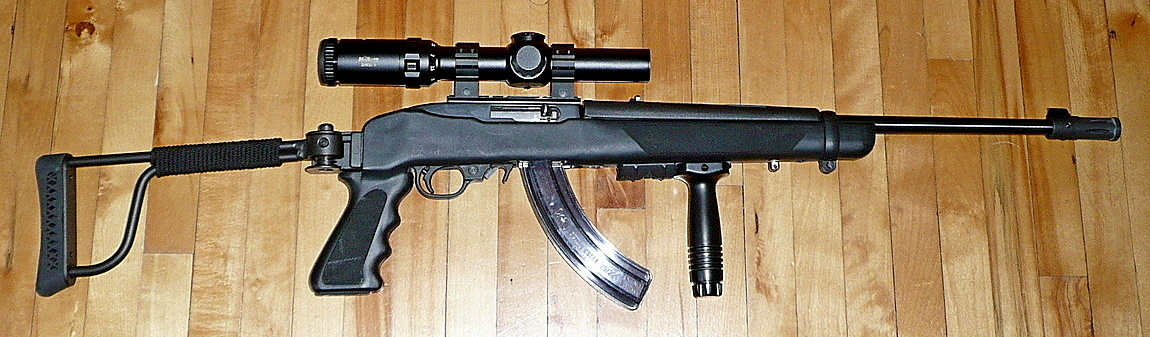
Ruger 10/22 Custom with a Butler Creek folding stock and a Millett DMS-1 rifle scope 1-4 X 24mm

The 10/22 is popular for small-game hunters and those who want an inexpensive rifle for firing inexpensive ammunition for target, plinking and survival use. This popularity has led to many after-market modifications being available to improve performance, augment the rifle's looks, or increase its magazine capacity, making the 10/22 one of the most customizable firearms ever made.

Custom manufacturers also make "clones" of the 10/22, which are similar in design (most parts will interchange) but built to much higher specifications and costs. The 10/22 barrel uses a unique two-screw, V-block system to attach the barrel to the receiver, allowing for removal or replacement of the barrel, which would ordinarily require the work of a gunsmith.

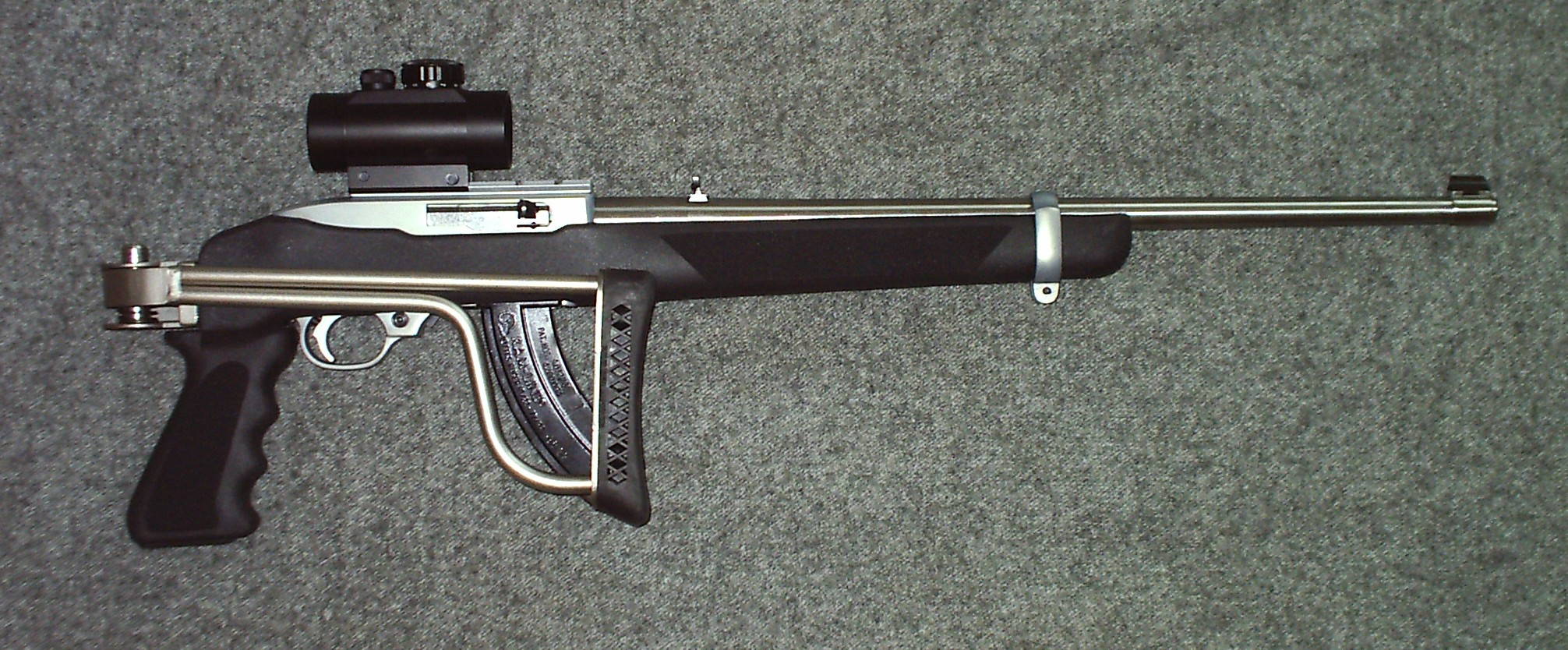
Ruger 10/22 "Stainless" With an aftermarket Butler Creek Folding Stock and a TRUGLO Red Dot Sight

=== Magazines ===
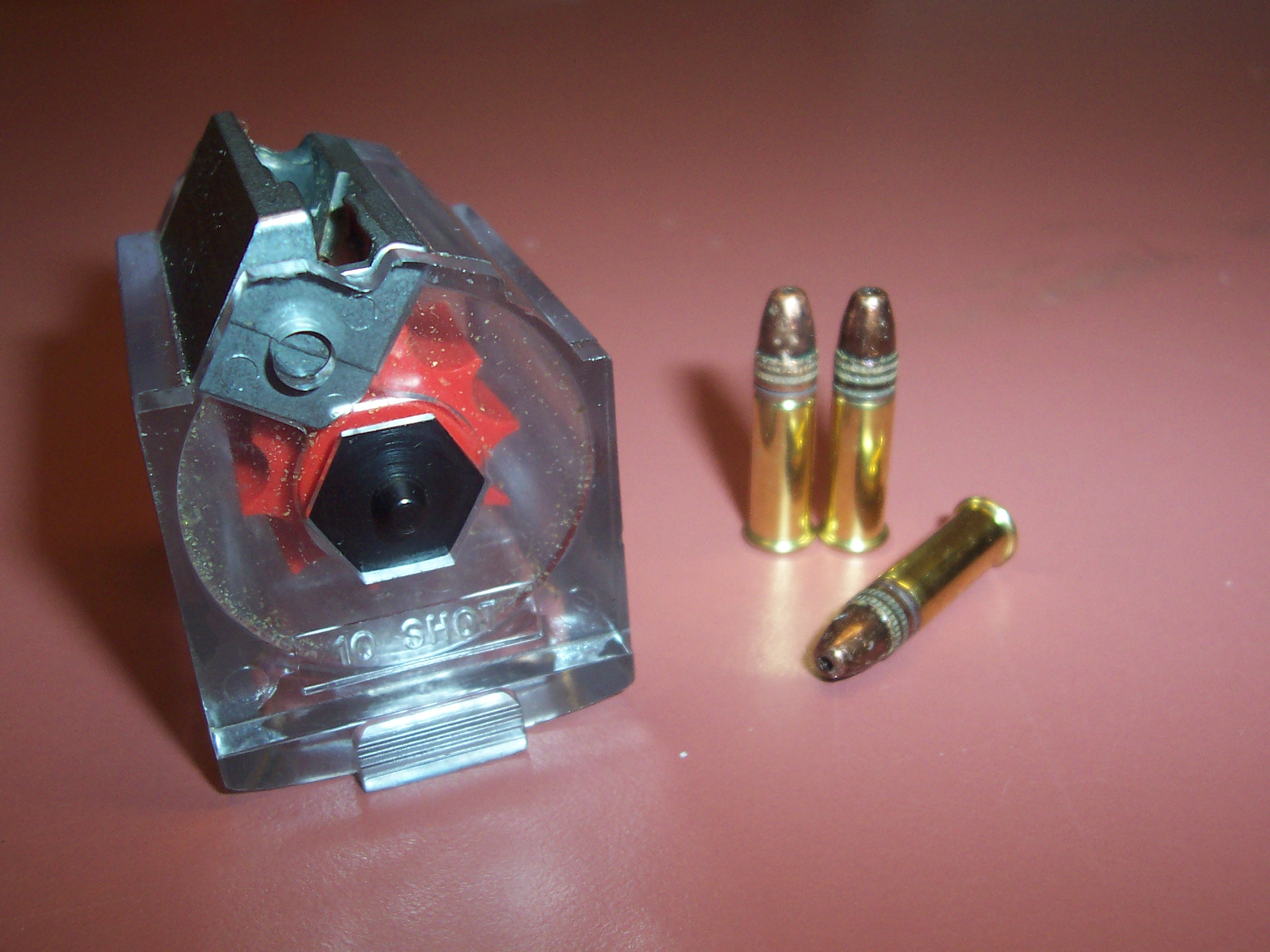
The "40th anniversary edition" BX-1CLR rotary magazine for Ruger 10/22. The clear body of the magazines shows its unusual rotary operation; the red cogwheel-like part is the rotary cartridge holder/follower.

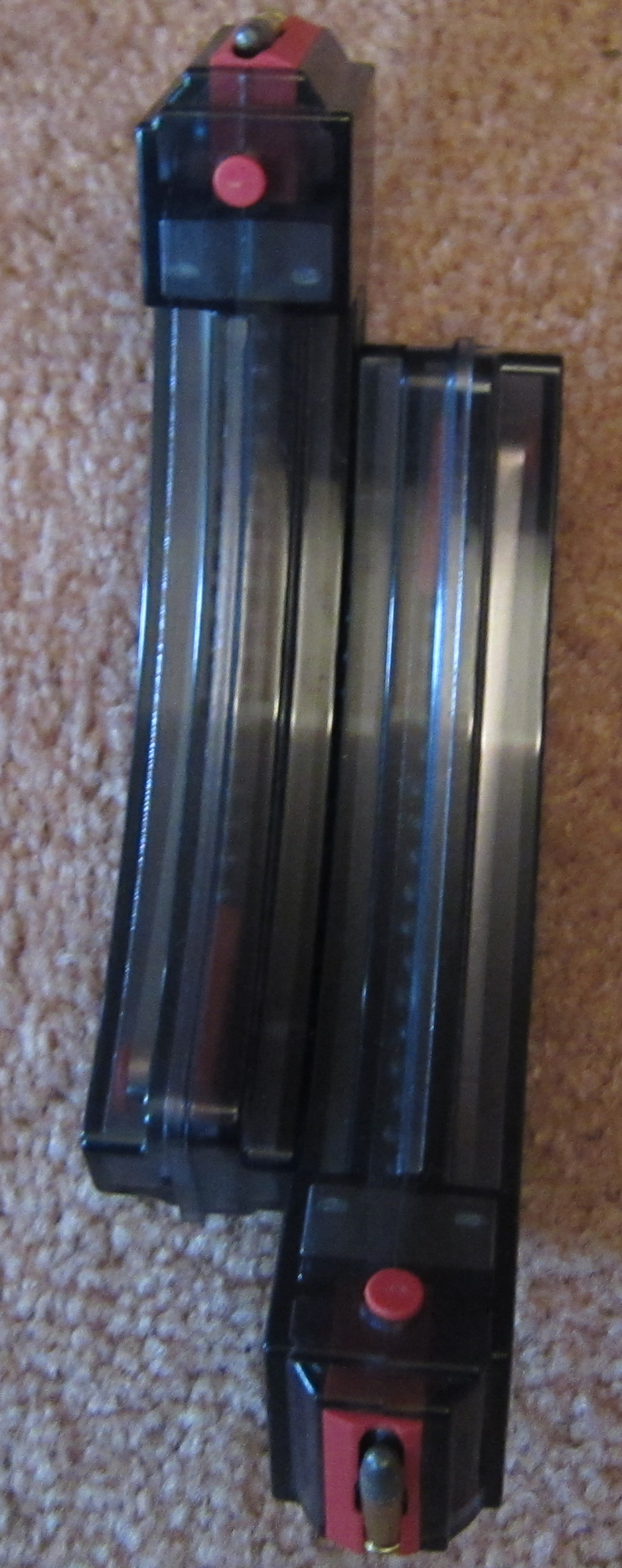
Two aftermarket 25-round magazines attached in Jungle style.

There are many types of magazines for the Ruger 10/22. The standard 10/22 ships with a black 10-round polymer rotary magazine, the BX-1.

In the mid 1980s many business ventures grew out of competition to supply the 10/22 with high-capacity alternatives to its standard 10-round magazine. Early producers were Condor, Eaton Supply, Butler Creek, Ram-Line, and Eagle International. After the expiration of the Federal Assault Weapons Ban (1994-2004), production of high-capacity magazines resumed with new firearm accessory companies like Pro-Mag, Black Dog, HC MAGS, and Tactical Innovation. Capacities ranged from 25-round "banana" magazines to 50-round drum and "teardrop" magazines.

In 2004, Ruger introduced a transparent polycarbonate version ("40th-anniversary edition") of the BX-1 called the BX-1CLR, as well as a 1-round version for training and a 5-round version for states or countries that restrict magazine capacities. In 2011–2012, Ruger came out with the BX-25, a curved 25-round box magazine with a black composite frame and steel feed lips, as well as the 15-round BX-15 box magazine for states that restrict magazine capacities. Aftermarket options include 25-, 30-, and 50-round box magazines; 50-round teardrop-shaped rotary magazines, and 50- and 110-round drum magazines.

The standard BX-1 rotary magazine stores the cartridges in a cogwheel-like holder, rather than stacked as seen in a box magazine. This allows the magazine to be compact and fit flush into the rifle without protruding from the stock at the natural balance point for one-handed carry. The bolt of the rifle pushes a cartridge from the metal feeding lip of the magazine with each shot, allowing the next cartridge to feed into place. The rotary magazine is also used by Ruger's American Rimfire series bolt-action rifles, as well as the 10/22-footprinted "Summit" toggle-action rifles produced by Primary Weapon Systems/Volquartsen.

Not all Ruger 10/22 magazines are interchangeable, and firing a magazine with the wrong type of ammunition can result in a malfunction.

== Variants ==
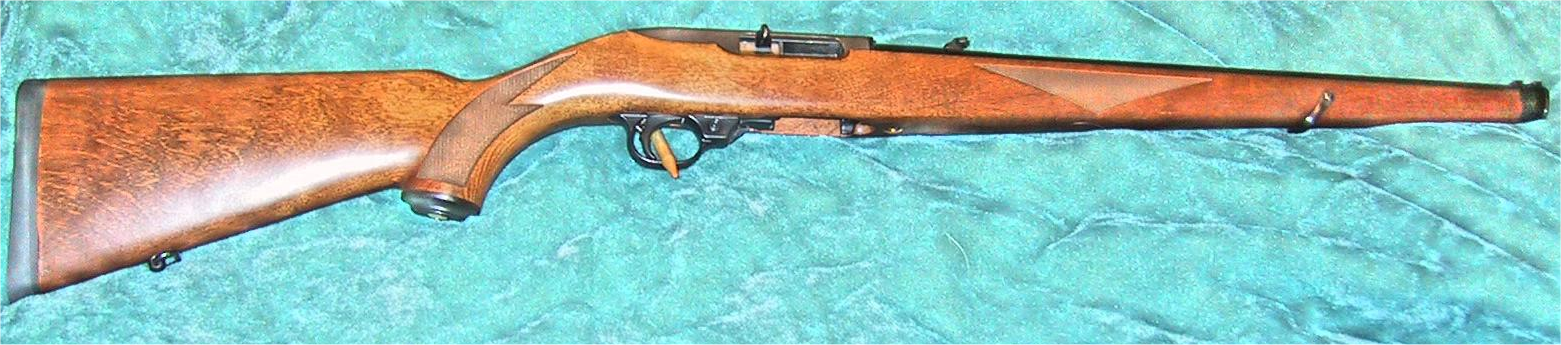
Ruger 10/22 International model, which comes with a full-length Mannlicher style stock

The 10/22 is available in a wide variety of configurations. In 2015, the Ruger 10/22 came in 11 different models, not counting distributor exclusives. The Carbine came in three models: the Tactical, Takedown, and Target, each with two models; the Sporter and Compact, each with one model. The discontinued 10/22 International model was fitted with a Mannlicher stock. Standard barrel lengths are 20" in the 10/22 Rifle, 18 1/2" in the 10/22 Carbine, and 16 1/8" in the 10/22 Compact Rifle which is also fitted with a shorter stock. All .22 Long Rifle versions use an aluminum receiver, while the discontinued .22 Magnum version used a steel receiver with integral scope bases.

=== 10/22 Carbine ===
Standard model with 18.5" barrel. Offered with hardwood or black synthetic stocks, black alloy, or stainless steel receivers and a model fitted with a LaserMax laser sight.

==== 10/22 Sporter ====
A model with 18.5", alternatively 20" or 22", barrel and checkered walnut stock with sling swivels.

==== 10/22 Target ====
Target shooting model with heavy 20" bull barrel with no iron sights.

==== 10/22 Target Lite ====
Introduced in 2018 the Target Lite is similar to the Target model but with a laminate thumbhole stock.

==== 10/22 Compact ====
Compact rifle with 16.12" barrel.

==== 10/22 Tactical ====
A model with 16.12" fitted with a flash suppressor. Also offered with 16.12" heavy target barrel with Hogue OverMolded stock fitted with a bipod.

==== 10/22 Competition ====
The 10/22 Competition rifle has a hard-coat anodized, CNC-machined receiver made from heat-treated and stress relieved 6061-T6511 aluminum. The receiver incorporates a rear cleaning port and an integral, optics-ready 30 MOA Picatinny rail. The rifle also has an enhanced semi-auto chamber, BX-Trigger, heat-treated and nitrided CNC-machined match bolt, 16-1/8" cold hammer-forged bull free-floating barrel which is fluted to reduce weight and dissipate heat and is also threaded with a 1/2"-28 pattern to accommodate the included muzzle brake or other barrel accessories.

==== Carbon Fiber ====
A model with a cold hammer-forged barrel tensioned in carbon fiber sleeve.

==== 50th Anniversary Rifle ====
In 2014 to mark the 50th anniversary of the Ruger 10/22 a contest was held to design an anniversary model. The winning design by public vote has a stainless steel 18.5" threaded barrel with flash suppressor, a lightweight black synthetic stock with interchangeable stock modules, a picatinny rail and ghost-ring adjustable rear sight.

==== Collector's Series ====
A limited-edition 50th Anniversary Collector's Series Carbine model was offered in 2014. It had a black alloy receiver with "1964-2014" special markings, 18.5" barrel, fiber optic sights, and a 25-round magazine.

==== Collector's Series Second Edition ====
In June 2015, Ruger announced a limited Second Edition of the Collector's Series 10/22 carbine. It features a dark grey version of Ruger's Modular Stock System found on the Ruger American Rimfire rifle, a protected non-glare blade front sight, ghost ring adjustable rear aperture sight, and a Picatinny rail.

==== Collector's Series Sixth Edition ====
Introduced in 2024, the Sixth Edition Ruger® Collector's Series 60th Anniversary 10/22® rifles feature a unique 60th Anniversary bolt marking and are accented with a red charging handle and trigger. The 60th Anniversary 10/22 ships in a Collector's Series box with a Sixth Edition Ruger Collector's Series metal street sign and pin. It is equipped with a Magpul Hunter X-22 polymer stock with an ergonomic grip, adjustable length of pull and comb height, multiple sling mounting options, a non-slip rubber buttpad, and M-LOK slots for accessory attachment.

==== VLEH Target Tactical Rifle ====
In 2009 Ruger also announced the Target Tactical Rifle model, a hybrid of the 10/22T and Ruger M77 Hawkeye Tactical rifle. V - Varmint barrel, L - Law + E - Enforcement model, H - Hogue stock.

=== 10/22 Takedown ===
On March 28, 2012, Ruger introduced the 10/22 Takedown model. This model disassembles into barrel and action/buttstock components. It is shipped in a backpack style case that has room for the rifle, ammunition, and accessories. The MSRP is higher than the basic carbine models. The standard Takedown model has a brushed aluminum receiver made to resemble stainless steel and 18.5" barrel with a black synthetic stock. Also offered in a black alloy receiver and 16.12" threaded barrel with a flash suppressor or with a threaded, fluted target barrel.

==== 10/22 Takedown Lite ====
The Takedown Lite models are similar to the other Takedown models but has a lightweight target barrel design.

=== SR-22 Rifle ===
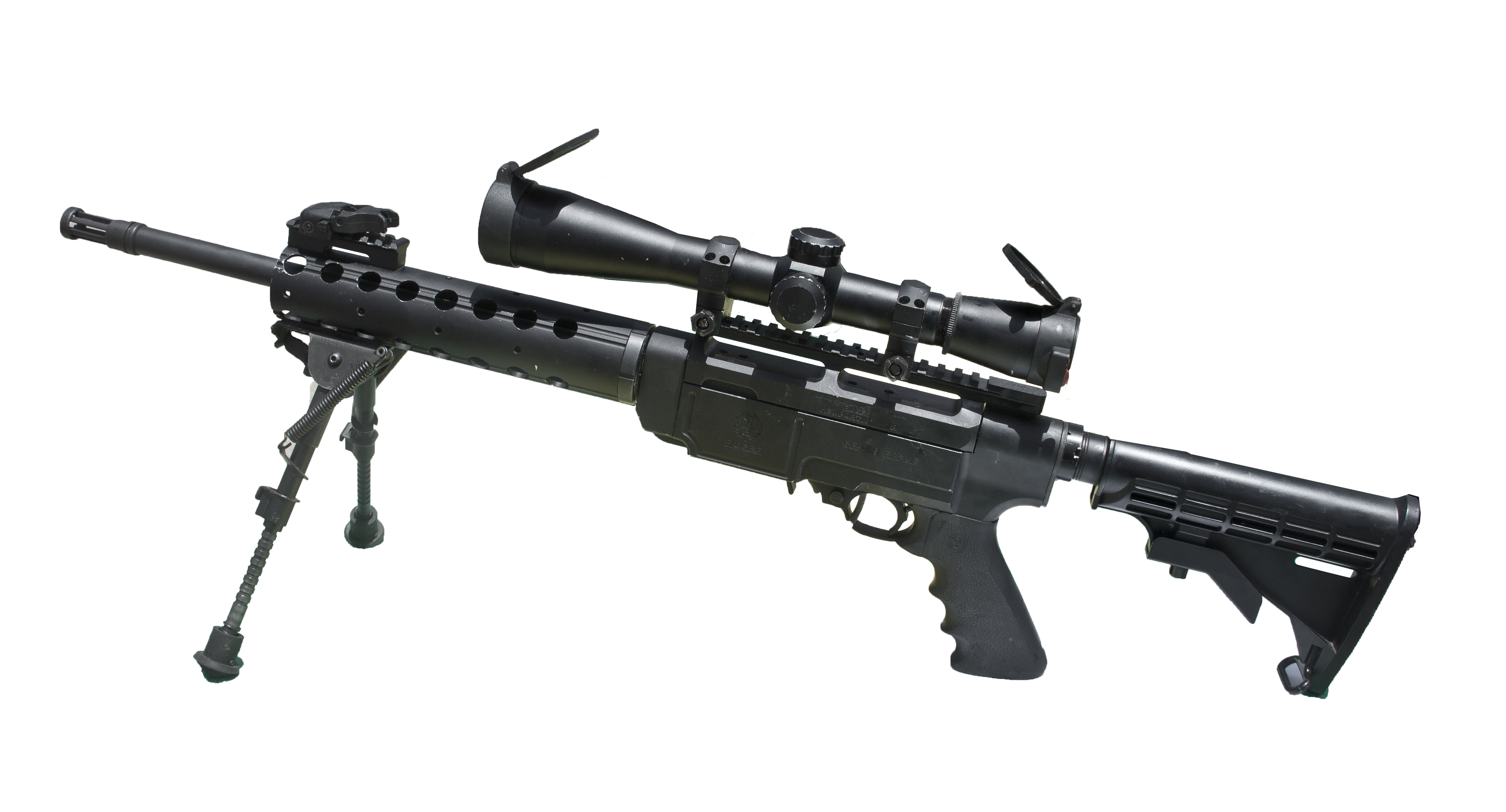
Ruger SR-22

In 2009, Ruger released the SR-22 Rifle model, a 10/22 receiver embedded in a chassis that mimics the dimensions of an AR-15 style rifle such as their own SR-556. The SR-22 Rifle uses standard 10/22 rotary magazines, in addition to most aftermarket 10/22 magazines. The positions of the magazine release, the safety and the charging handle are all more similar to a standard 10/22 than an AR-15. The SR-22 Rifle competes directly with other AR-15 style rimfire rifles such as those made by Colt and Smith & Wesson. The SR-22 rifle boasts an aluminium handguard, adjustable six position stock, and a top receiver rail. Threaded holes on the handguard provide the customization of optional attachment rails.

=== 22 Charger Pistol ===
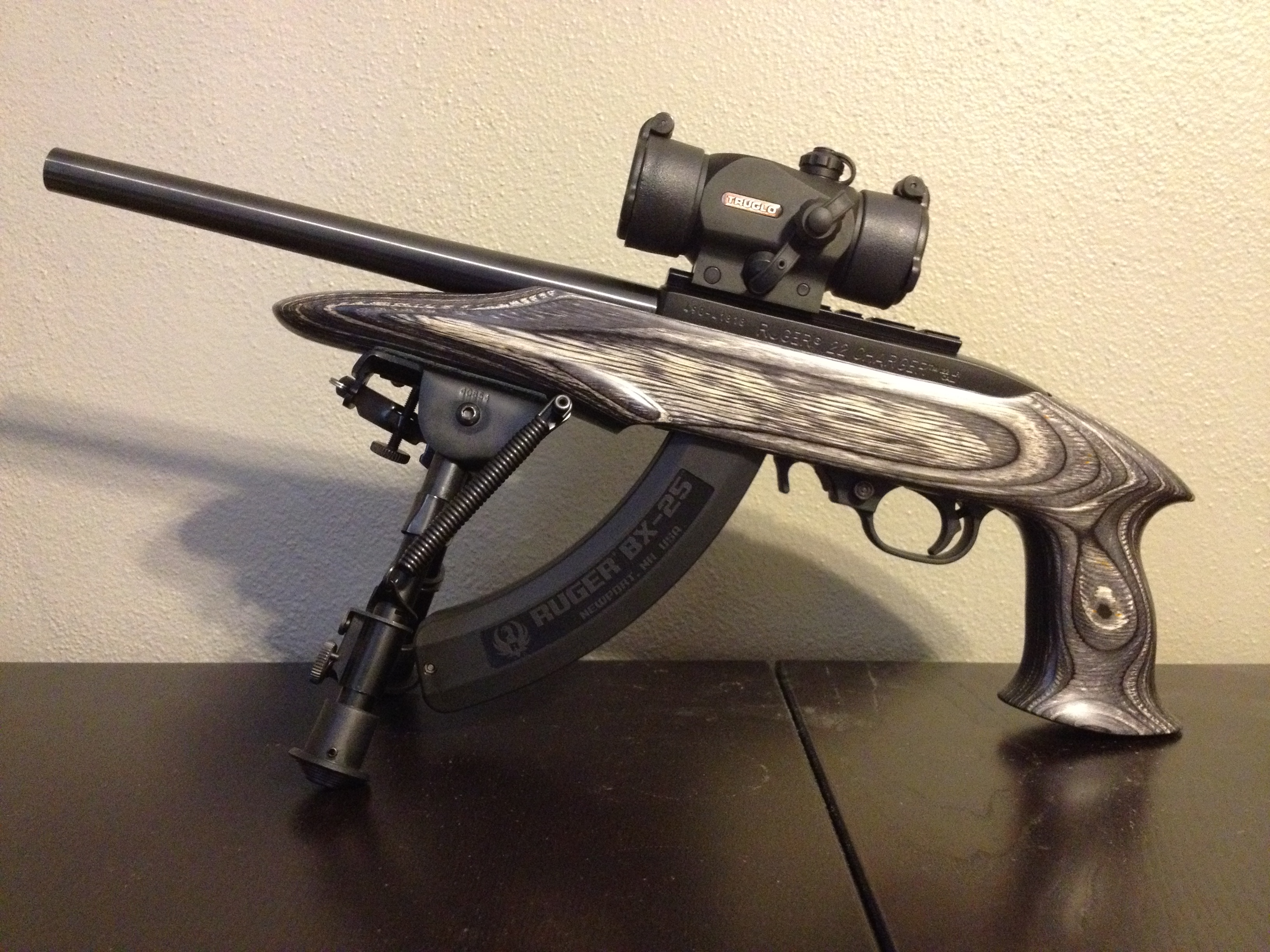
Ruger Charger. Comes with a bipod. Shown with aftermarket Truglo multi-color reflexive dot scope and Ruger BX-25 extended magazine.

The 22 Charger pistol, first introduced in late 2007, is a pistol based on the 10/22 action. The 22 Charger originally came with a black laminated wood pistol stock with forend, a 10-inch (254 mm) matte blued heavy barrel, a bipod, and a Weaver style scope base in lieu of iron sights. Overall length is just under 20 inches (510 mm), making it quite large for a handgun. As it has an included bipod it is likely to be used from a shooting bench or table. The bipod attaches to a sling swivel on the stock fore-end and is easily removable. Due to technical features, such as the magazine being outside the pistol grip, the Charger is not legally available in some U.S. states. The 22 Charger was later discontinued. It was reintroduced in December 2014, with a brown laminate stock with a M16A2 style pistol grip, 10-inch threaded barrel, picatinny rail, 15-round magazine and adjustable bipod. At the same time a "Takedown" model was introduced with a green laminate stock. Both models were later offered from September 2015 with black polymer stocks. It was discontinued in 2026 and replaced by the 10/22 SBR.

=== 10/22 Magnum ===
The 10/22 Magnum was produced from 1998 to 2006 and was chambered for the .22 Magnum cartridge.

=== 10/17 Magnum ===
The 10/17 Magnum was announced in 2004 and was chambered for the .17 HMR cartridge. It was never released or sold to the public, but it was listed in their catalog from 2004 to 2005.

=== Silent-SR ISB ===
The Silent-SR ISB is a barrel assembly offered by Ruger in 2016, which is available for any 10/22 Takedown, 10/22 Takedown Lite rifles and the 22 Charger Takedown pistol.

=== 10/22 SBR ===
Short-barreled rifle (“SBR”) versions of the 10/22 were released in 2026. Two 10/22 SBR models each feature a reversible folding stock with an adjustable length of pull, a BX-Trigger, a match bolt release, and a threaded cold hammer-forged barrel. Model 33000 features an eight-inch alloy steel barrel and a receiver with an integrated rear cleaning port for easy maintenance. Model 33001 is a Takedown rifle equipped with a 10-inch barrel tensioned inside an aluminum alloy sleeve for enhanced rigidity and accuracy.

== Modifications ==
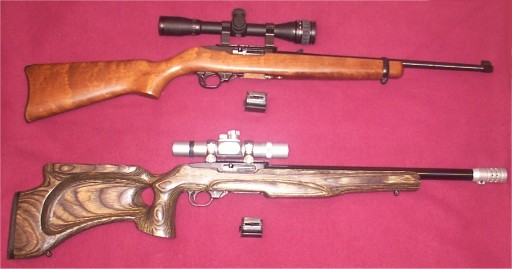
Standard Ruger 10/22 Carbine, and a highly modified Ruger 10/22

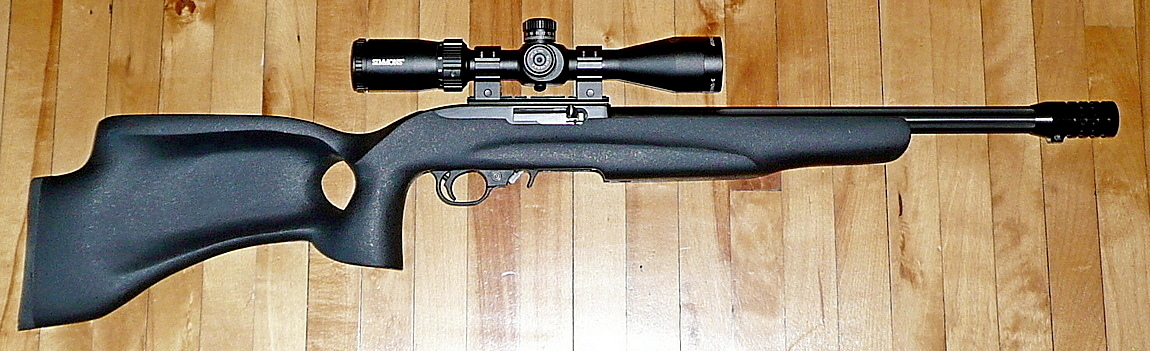
Ruger 10/22 Custom Target with a Boyds Blaster stock

A wide variety of aftermarket modification kits are offered for the 10/22, including conversions to bullpup configuration and cosmetic alterations to replicate the appearance of weapons like the M1 Carbine, Thompson submachine gun, FN P90, and AR-15.

=== AWC Ultra II ===
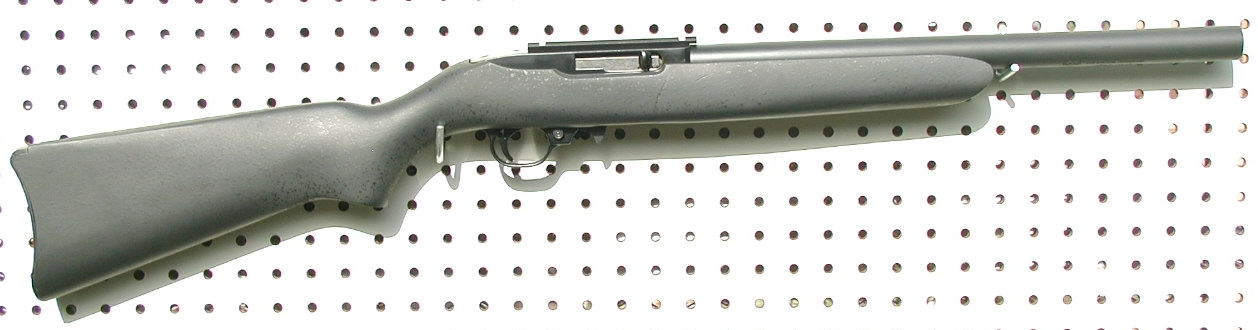
The integrally-suppressed AWC Ultra II

The AWC Ultra II is a modified version of the Ruger 10/22 made by AWC Systech and has an integrally-suppressed shortened barrel. The sound suppressor encloses a ported stainless barrel and is made of 300 series stainless steel having a 1" diameter which closely resembles a bull barrel. The barrel length is 16.5" with an overall weapon length of 34 1/2" and the weight is 6 lbs. Due to the integral suppressor, this model is a Title II weapon in the U.S.

=== AT 10/22 QD ===
The AT 10/22 QD is a short-barreled modified version of the 10/22 made by Arms Tech Limited. It features a six-inch barrel, a folding stock, and is designed to accept Arms Tech's own QD-223 suppressor. It comes in at a mere 5 pounds without the suppressor. Due to its extremely short barrel, it is considered a Title II weapon in the U.S.

== Copies ==
=== Thompson/Center T/CR22 ===
The Thompson/Center T/CR22 is a .22 LR-caliber clone of the Ruger 10/22 semi-automatic rifle manufactured by Thompson/Center Arms.

=== Bergara BXR ===
The Bergara BXR is a .22 LR-caliber clone of the Ruger 10/22 semi-automatic rifle manufactured by Bergara in Spain. It can take Ruger 10/22 magazines.

=== GEAM Guns Corbett 22 ===
The Ghaziabad Engines and Machines Pvt. Ltd. (GEAM) Guns Corbet 22 is the first semi-automatic .22-caliber rifle to be manufactured in India. It is designed specifically for the Indian civilian market under the Non-Prohibited Bore (NPB) category.

=== TANDEMKROSS TKX22 Light Rifle ===
The TANDEMKROSS TKX22 Light Rifle is a premium, competition-ready semi-automatic .22 LR rifle designed for extreme lightweight performance, weighing just 3 lbs 6 oz unloaded. It is built on a custom TKX22 receiver and is fully compatible with standard Ruger 10/22 magazines and accessories. It is designed from the ground up to be fully compatible with the 10/22 ecosystem.

== Military users ==
- Israel: The Ruger 10/22 has seen limited use by the Israel Defense Forces in the Israeli–Palestinian conflict as a "less lethal" weapon for security and crowd or riot control purposes in the Palestinian territories. The IDF uses a modified carbine rifle version with a scope and a suppressor, which would allow for quiet operation with no loud noises to indicate the shot's origin. The use of the rifle by the IDF as a less lethal weapon has been (and remains) controversial. In 2001, its use as a less lethal weapon was banned by the Military Advocate General Menachem Finkelstein, but in 2009, it was reintroduced to service. It has since continued to be responsible for multiple fatalities, especially among younger Palestinians, with the latest victim having been killed in December 2020.

== See also ==
- Intratec TEC-22 – Semi-automatic handgun manufactured by Intratec
- Ruger Model 44
- USFA ZiP .22 – Semi-automatic handgun manufactured by U.S. Fire Arms Manufacturing Company

== Bibliography ==
- Wilson, R. L. (1996). Ruger & His Guns: A History of the Man, the Company, and Their Firearms. New York: Simon & Schuster. ISBN 0-684-80367-4. OCLC 33820244.
- Kuleck, Walt (2015). The Ruger 10/22 Complete Owner's and Assembly Guide. Pennsylvania: Scott A. Duff Publications. ISBN 978-1-888722-20-8.
