= Marlin Firearms =

American firearms manufacturing company

- Type: Subsidiary
- Industry: Arms industry
- Founded: 1872; 154 years ago in North Haven, Connecticut
- Founder: John Mahlon Marlin
- Headquarters: Madison, North Carolina, U.S.
- Products: Firearms
- Parent: Sturm, Ruger & Co.
- Website: www.marlinfirearms.com

Marlin Firearms is an American manufacturer of semi-automatic, lever-action and bolt-action rifles. In the past the company (based in Madison, North Carolina, and formerly based in North Haven, Connecticut) made shotguns, derringers, revolvers, and razor blades. Marlin owned the firearm manufacturer H&R Firearms. In 2007, Remington Arms, part of the Remington Outdoor Company, acquired Marlin Firearms. Remington produced Marlin-brand firearms at its Kentucky and New York manufacturing facilities. In 2020, Sturm, Ruger & Co. bought the Marlin business from the bankrupt Remington Outdoor Company.

== History ==
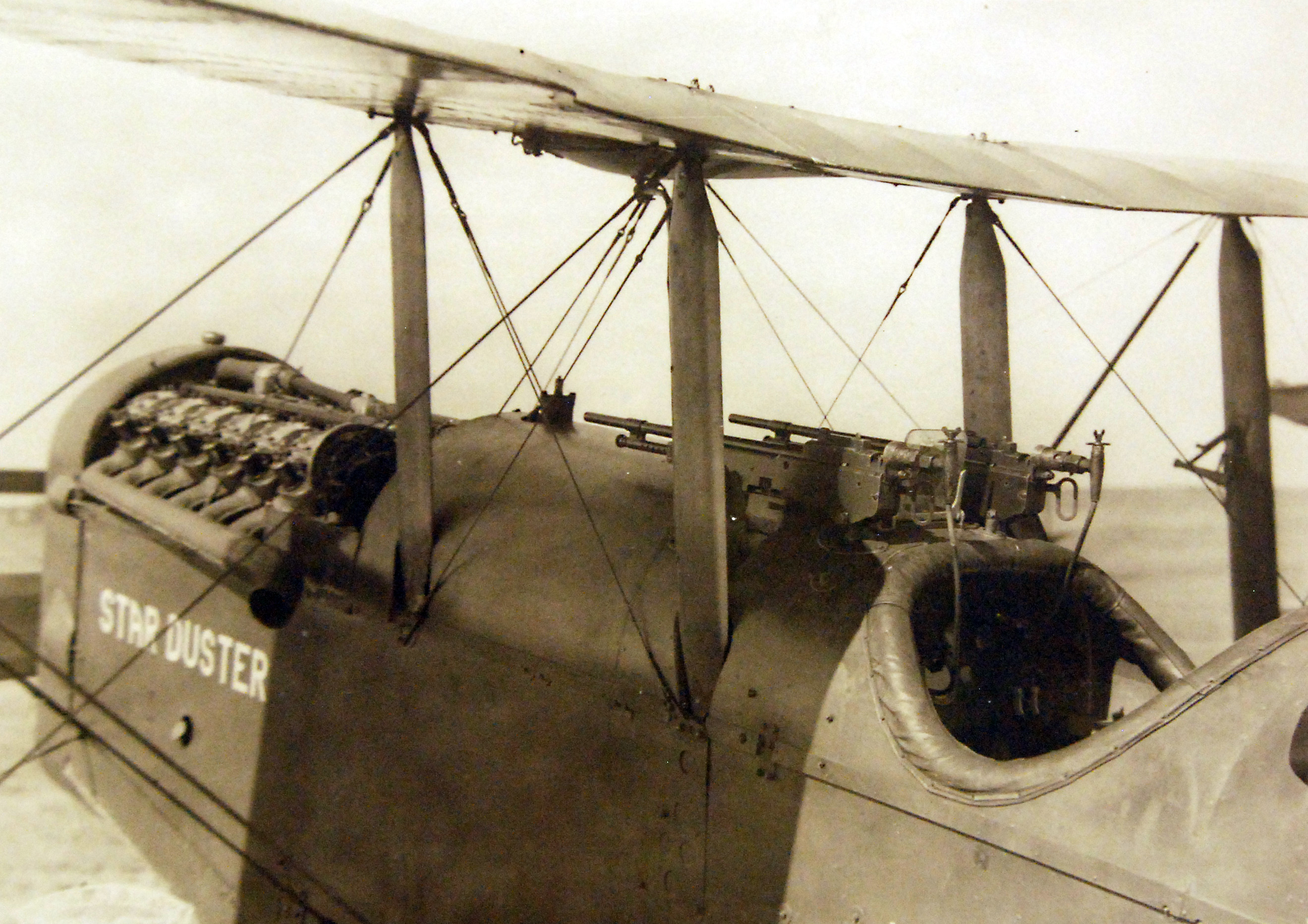
Marlin gun mounted on De Havilland airplane, 1921

Marlin Firearms was founded in 1872 by John Marlin. Marlin produced a large assortment of firearms such as lever-action rifles, pump-action shotguns, and single-shot rifles. Marlin was considered the main competitor to Winchester.

In World War I Marlin became one of the largest machine gun producers in the world for the US and its Allies, building the M1895 Colt–Browning machine gun and a later variant called the "Marlin gun" optimized for aircraft use. In 1917, Marlin Rockwell bought out the Hopkins & Allen Arms Company to promote an expanded line of firearms and restore the image of the Marlin company as makers of "sporting arms."

Marlin Firearms labored for a century as an underdog levergun maker to Winchester (formerly of New Haven). However, in the 1980s and 1990s, Marlin finally began to outpace its old rival. It is currently the dominant seller of lever-action rifles in North America. Its use of side ejection allows for flat-topped firearms, thereby making the mounting of scopes easier than for traditional Winchesters. This helped Marlin capture more market share as American shooters came to rely more and more on optics. Marlins are larger, stronger, and heavier than most of the comparable Winchester lines, allowing Marlin to use higher powered cartridges such as the .45-70. Marlin's model 1894 lever-action rifles and carbines are available in handgun calibers, including .357 Magnum, .44 Magnum and .41 Magnum, making them suitable companion long guns for revolvers in those calibers.

=== Acquisitions ===
In November 2000, Marlin purchased the assets of H&R 1871, Inc., a Massachusetts-based manufacturer of shotguns and rifles (New England Firearms branded) founded in 1871 and now located in Gardner, Massachusetts. Marketing its products under the brand names of Harrington & Richardson and New England Firearms, H&R 1871 claimed to be the largest manufacturer of Single-shot shotguns and rifles in the world.

In December 2007 Cerberus Capital Management a parent of Remington Arms Company purchased Marlin. Remington announced in April 2008 that it would close the Gardner manufacturing plant by the end of 2008 affecting 200 workers. In March 2010, Marlin announced that it would close its North Haven plant, and move the work to Remington plants in Ilion, New York, and Mayfield, Kentucky.

In September 2020, Sturm, Ruger & Co. bought the Company from bankrupt Remington Outdoor Company.

== Products ==
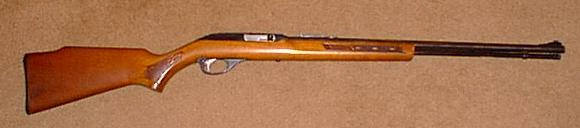
Marlin Model 60 .22LR rifle manufactured in 1982

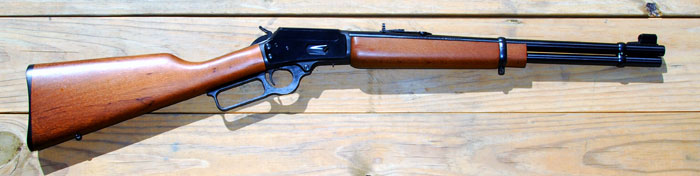
Marlin Model 1894C – .357 Magnum carbine

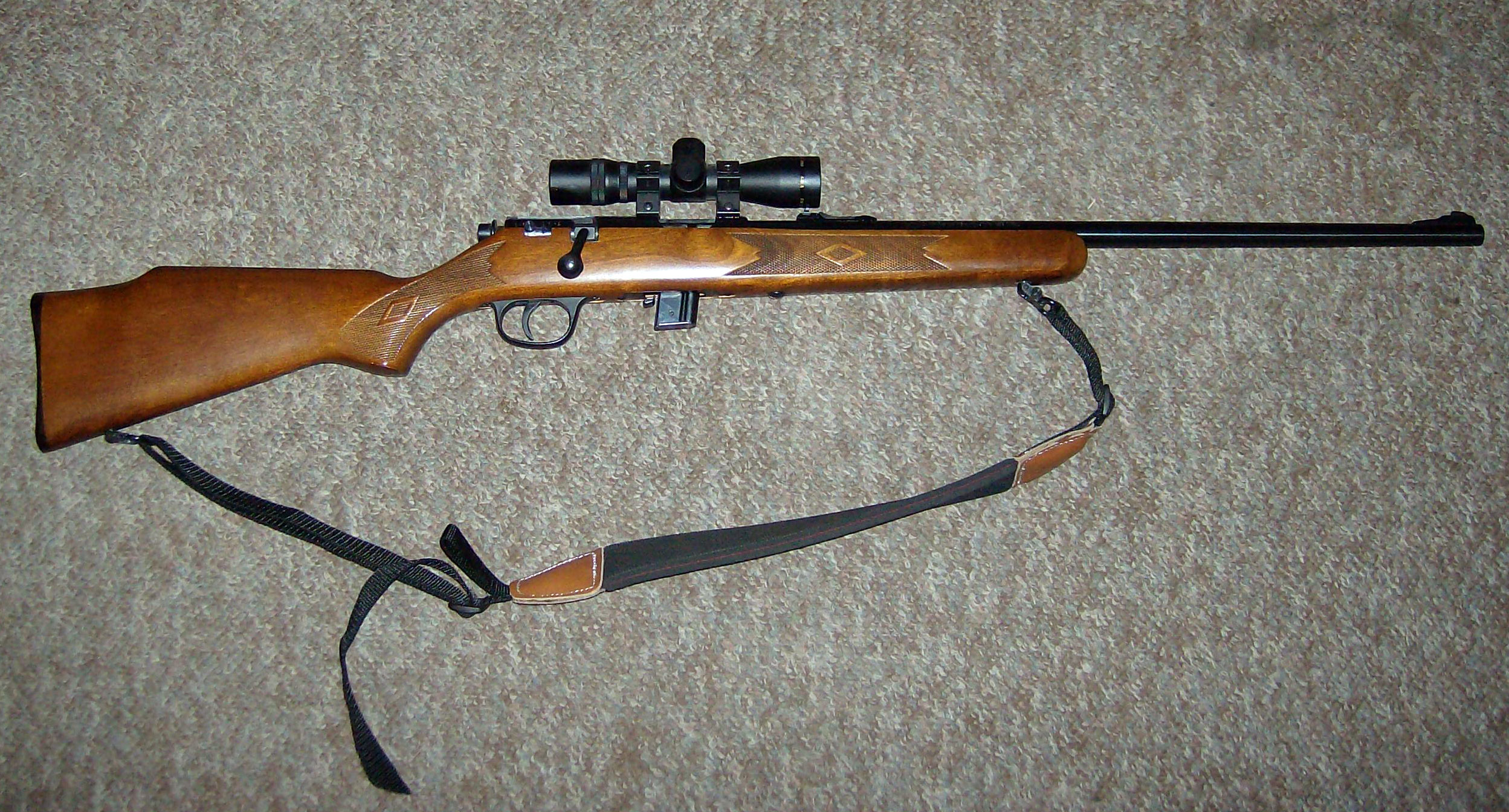
Marlin Model 25N .22 LR rifle with aftermarket sling and scope

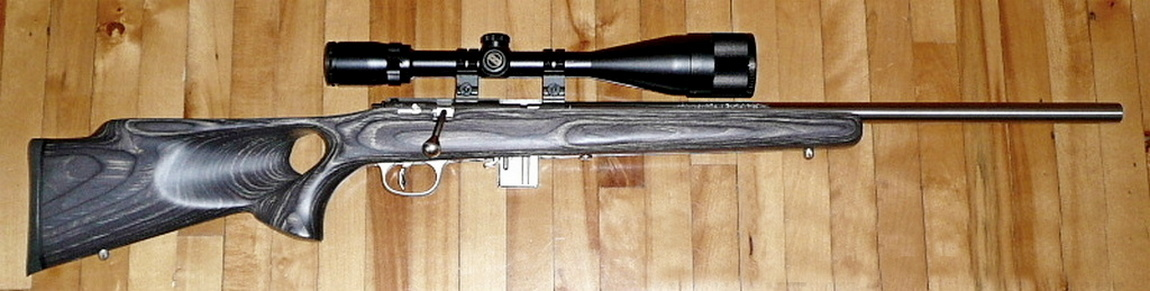
Marlin Model XT-17 VSLB .17 HMR with rifle scope

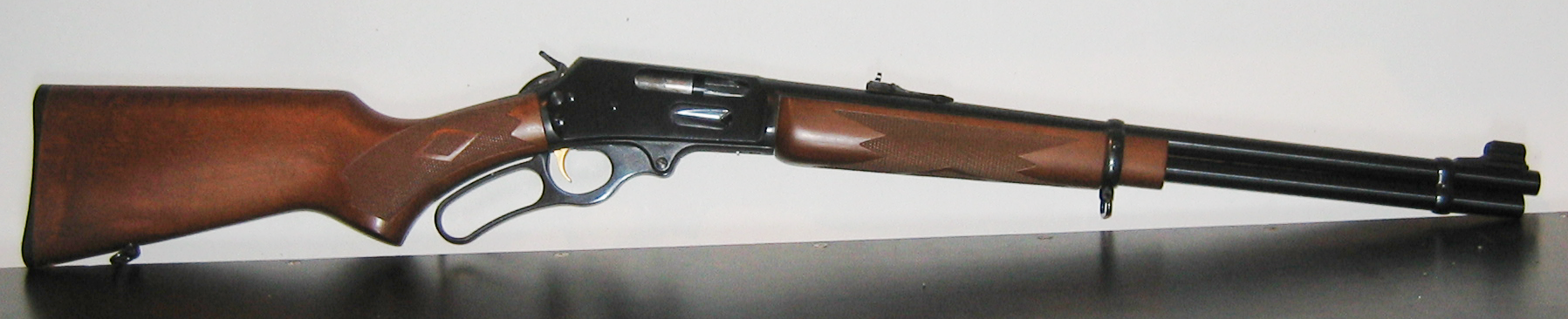
Marlin Model 336W lever action in .30-30 Winchester

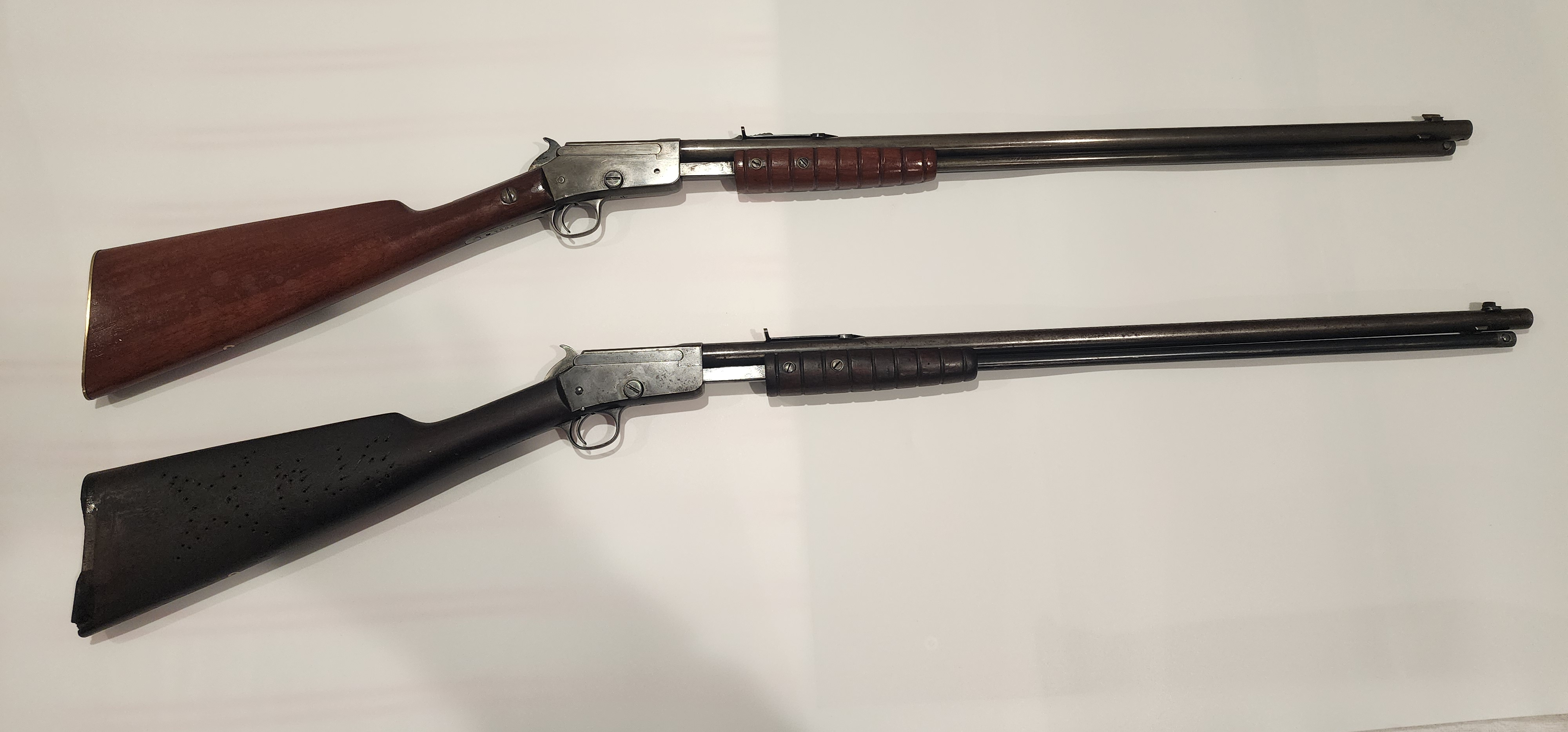
Two examples of Marlin model 37 pump .22

Major models of Marlin rifles include:

- Marlin Model 20, 20s, 27, 27s, 29, 37, and 47 Pump-action rifles chambered in .22 Short, .22 Long, .22LR. All with tubular magazines. Early models had octagon barrels. The model 37 was manufactured between 1927-1930 only and is very rare today.
- Marlin Model 1881, lever action repeater, the first commercially successful lever action that could handle big bore cartridges such as .38-55 and .45-70.
- Marlin Model 1893, lever action repeater, the precursor of the Model 36 and 336, identifiable by the square flush bolt.
- Marlin Model 1894, lever action carbines in revolver calibers — .357 Magnum (1894C), .41 Magnum (1894FG & 1894S), .44 Magnum (1894SS or plain 1894), and .45 Colt (1894 Cowboy) Based on the original 1894.
- Marlin Model 1895 Several versions like 1895, G, GBL, GS, M, SBL, CB. All are chambered for the .45/70 caliber except for the "M" (.450) Introduced in the 1970s, based on the Model 336 and named after the original 1895.
- Marlin Model 1895 Square bolt. The original rifle introduced in 1895, based on the 1893 action but scaled up for larger cartridges such as 45-70 and 45-90 to replace the Model 1881.
- Marlin Model 444, produced from 1964 to present date. Variations include (from oldest to newest) 444T, 444S, 444SS, 444P (Outfitter) and 444XLR.
- Marlin Model 1897, lever action repeater, the precursor of the Model 39 and 39A.
- Marlin Model 25M, .22 WMR bolt-action rifle.
- Marlin Model 25MG, .22 WMR, smooth bore, bolt-action shotgun. It was designed and marketed as a "Garden Gun."
- Marlin Model 25N, now the Model 925, a .22 Short, .22 Long, and .22 Long Rifle bolt-action rifle.
- Marlin Model XT-22 available in long rifle and .22 WMR. There are 15 variations of this rifle available.
- Marlin Model XT-17 chambered for .17 HMR. There are several variations of this rifle available.
- Marlin Model Golden 39A, lever action repeater, the longest continuously produced rifle in the world.
- Marlin Levermatic, an innovative short-throw lever-action rifle in a variety of small cartridges.
- Marlin Model 60, a popular .22 LR caliber semi-automatic rifle.
- Marlin Model 336, one of the most popular lever-action hunting rifles in the world.
- Marlin Camp carbine, a discontinued model.
- Marlin Model 70P "Papoose", a lightweight, magazine-fed, .22 LR carbine with a detachable barrel; it is designed to be taken down for easy transport while camping, backpacking, etc.
- Marlin Model 795, a .22 LR semi-automatic rifle.
- Marlin Model 700, a .22 LR semi-automatic rifle, similar to the Model 795, but has a heavy tapered target barrel.
- Marlin 780, a bolt-action hunting rifle.
- Marlin Model 80 (and subsequent 80C etc.) Bolt action .22 rimfire using 7-capacity detachable magazine introduced circa 1939, the predecessor to later versions such as Model 25, etc.
- Marlin Model 7000, a .22 LR semi-automatic rifle, similar to the Model 795, but has a heavy non-tapered target barrel.
- Marlin Model 2000, a .22 LR bolt-action rifle, designed for competition target shooting (biathlon version available).
- Marlin Model MR7, a long action center fire bolt-action rifle available in .30-06, .270, and .25-06 manufactured from 1996-1999 A few were offered in .280 Remington in 1999.
- Marlin Model XL7, a long action center fire bolt-action rifle available in .30-06, .270, and .25-06.
- Marlin Model XS7, a short action center fire bolt-action rifle available in .308, .243 Win, and 7mm-08.
- Marlin Model 1881, one of the earliest large caliber lever-action repeating rifles.

Significant variations of many of these rifles have usually also been manufactured. For example, there are six distinctly different variations manufactured for the Marlin Model 60. Marlin has been making lever-action rifles since 1881, and in 2008, they produced their 30 millionth lever-action rifle, which was donated to the NRA Institute for Legislative Action.

Double-barrel shotguns:

- L.C. Smith Double

The Marlin Model 90 Over and Under

Exposed hammer, pump-action shotguns:

- Marlin 1898
- Marlin Model(s) 16, 17, 19, 21, 24, 26, 30, 42, and 49

Hammerless pump-action shotguns:

- Marlin Model(s) 28, 31, 43, 44, 53, 63, 120

Submachine guns:

- M2 Hyde, a World War II submachine gun prototype
- United Defense M42, a World War II submachine gun for OSS

Revolvers:

- Little Joker
- O.K. Revolver
- XXX Standard 1872
- XX Standard 1873
- Standard 1875
- Tip Up 1878
- Top Break 1887

Derringers include:

- 1st Model
- O.K. Derringer Square Butt "Rare"
- O.k. Derringer Birds Head
- Victor Derringer
- Nevermiss Derringer
- Stonewall Derringer "Extremely Rare"

=== Beyond firearms ===
Marlin Firearms was also in the razor blade business from the 1930s into the 1970s, including at times offering them for mail order direct from the company. They outsourced the production of the blades, which brought them into conflict with the Federal Trade Commission in 1939 when some advertising had listed them as the "manufacturer" of the blades.

== MicroGroove Rifling ==
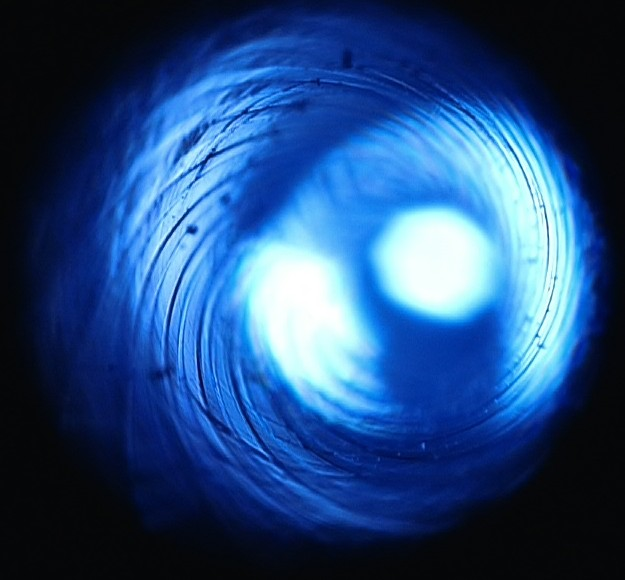
Micro-Groove rifling

In 1953 Marlin Firearms was issued U.S. patent 3,100,358 for what was named MicroGroove Rifling, which was a departure from the standard "Ballard", or cut rifling. One purpose of Microgroove rifling was to increase the speed of producing rifle barrels. Microgroove rifling is described in the patent as having 5 grooves for every 1/10 of an inch bore diameter, and that the driving side of each land would be "tangentially disposed" to prevent accumulating fouling in use.

Marlin introduced Microgroove rifling in their .22 Rimfire barrels in July 1953, with 16 grooves that were .014" wide, and nominally .0015" deep. Ballard rifled barrels have grooves generally in the range of .069–.090" wide, and .0015–.003" deep. This change was marketed in the 1954 Marlin catalog, as having numerous advantages that this new form of rifling had, including better accuracy, ease of cleaning, elimination of gas leakage, higher velocities and lower chamber pressures. The catalog also claimed that Microgroove rifling did not distort the bullet jacket as deeply as Ballard rifling hence improving accuracy with jacketed bullets at standard velocity.

Designed for factory loaded ammunition, Microgroove barrels have a reputation for accuracy problems with centerfire ammunition handloaded with cast lead bullets due to the increased bore diameter generated by the shallow grooves. The use of oversized cast bullets greatly solves this problem, restoring accuracy with cast bullet handloads to levels seen from Ballard rifled barrels. Early Marlin .30-30 microgroove barrels had a twist rate of 1 turn in 10 inches optimized for factory ammunition with jacketed bullets; later Marlin .30-30 microgroove barrels show a twist rate of 1 turn in 10.5 inches which improves accuracy with cartridges loaded to lower velocity than standard.
