= Marlin Model 780 =

- Type: Rifle
- Place of origin: United States

Production history
- Manufacturer: Marlin Firearms
- Produced: ended in 1988
- Variants: Marlin Model 781 Marlin Model 782 Marlin Model 783

Specifications
- Mass: 6 lb (2.7 kg)
- Length: 41 in (1,000 mm)
- Barrel length: 21.25 in (540 mm)
- Cartridge: .22 LR
- Caliber: .22 in (5.6 mm)
- Action: Bolt Action
- Feed system: 7 round box magazine
- Sights: open rear, ramp front

The Marlin Model 780 is a .22 bolt-action rifle produced by Marlin Firearms Company of North Haven, Connecticut. Major features include micro-groove barrel, a 2-position safety lever, walnut stock, and 7-round box magazine. Production of the model 780 ended in 1988, and it was replaced by the Marlin 880 in 1989.

== Features ==
The Marlin Model 780 features a 21.25-inch (540 mm) barrel with micro-groove rifling (16 grooves). It has buckhorn iron sights. It has a 2-position thumb safety lever. It uses a 7-round blued steel box magazine. It is capable of chambering .22 Short, .22 Long, and .22 Long Rifle cartridges.

== Uses ==
The Marlin 780 is well suited for small game hunting. It can also be used for low-cost but serious target practice or hunting practice, or just plinking around. It is ideal for young shooters since it is small and lightweight. Since it can chamber .22 Short it is capable of target practice or pest control with less noise than a .22 Long Rifle. Its microgroove barrel makes it highly accurate at longer distances compared to most other .22 LR rifles.

== Variants ==
- Model 780- removable box magazine
- Model 781- fixed tubular magazine
- Marlin Model 782- identical to the model 780 but chambered in .22 Winchester Magnum Rimfire
- Marlin Model 783- identical to the model 781 but chambered in .22 Winchester Magnum Rimfire
- Model 25 identical to Model 780 but with a birch stock rather than walnut. Originally introduced as part of Marlin's budget Glenfield line, and continued as a Marlin "promotion model" after the Glenfield line was retired in 1983.
