= Marlin Camp carbine =

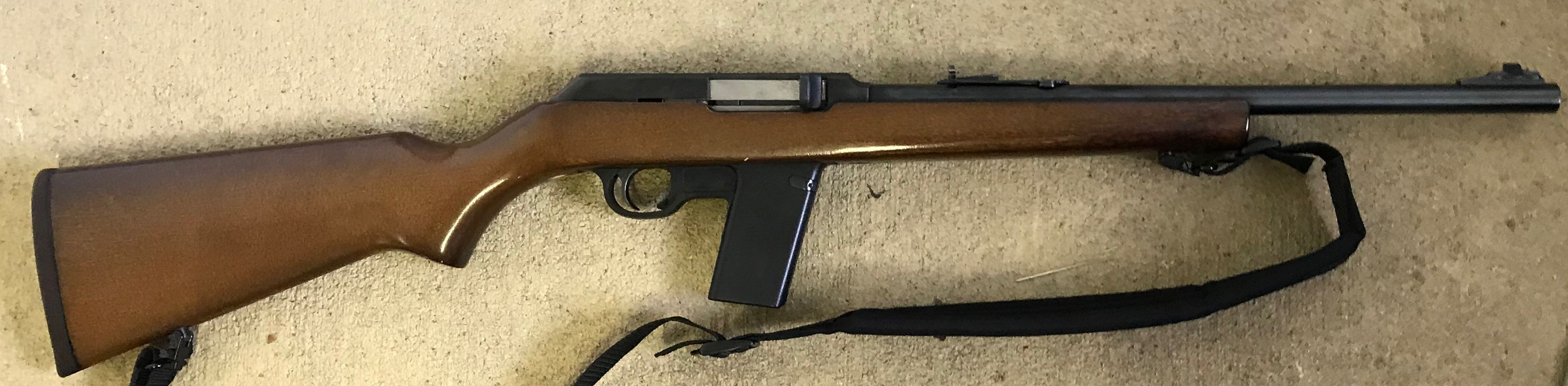
- Marlin Camp-45
- Type: Hunting rifle
- Place of origin: United States

Production history
- Manufacturer: Marlin Firearms Company
- Produced: 1985–1999
- Variants: 9mm and .45 ACP Versions

Specifications
- Mass: 6¾ pounds
- Length: 35½"
- Barrel length: 16½"
- Cartridge: .45 ACP; 9mm Parabellum
- Action: Direct blowback semi-automatic
- Feed system: 4 or 7-round (Camp-45); 4, 12, or 20-round (Camp-9) Detachable pistol magazine
- Sights: Fixed, drilled, and tapped for scope mounts

The Marlin Camp carbine is a self-loading carbine chambered for either 9mm Parabellum or .45 ACP, formerly manufactured by Marlin Firearms Company of North Haven, Connecticut. The carbine has been discontinued since 1999.

== Description ==
As the name implies, it was designed as a utility firearm to be used around hunting camps for foraging or defense. It was made in 9mm Parabellum and .45 ACP calibers and can use the same magazines as popular handguns in those calibers, in keeping with a convenient American tradition of having a carbine and handgun using common ammunition. The carbine operates by direct blowback. Usually, the receiver is drilled and tapped for a scope mount. The stock was made of walnut-finished Maine birch.

The Camp carbine uses a detachable magazine that inserts into the magazine well in front of the trigger guard. The Camp-45 rifle magazine is compatible with most Colt 1911–type magazines; and the Camp-9 rifle magazine can be replaced by magazines from 59-series S&W pistols. The Camp-9 magazine well is sized for 12-round magazines; magazines with higher capacities extend beyond the bottom of the well. A 20-round magazine was produced, but discontinued in 1989. Numerous aftermarket magazines and drums were produced for both models.
