= John Mahlon Marlin =

- Born: May 6, 1836; Boston Neck, near Windsor Locks, Hartford County, Connecticut
- Died: July 1, 1901 (age 65); New Haven, Connecticut
- Spouse: Martha Susan Moore
- Children: Mahlon Henry Marlin (Jul 23, 1864) Burton Lewis Marlin (May 14, 1867-April 12, 1869); Jennett Bradford Marlin (March 18, 1871-September 14, 1883) John Howard Marlin (September 21, 1876)
- Parent(s): Mahlon Marlin and Jennette Bradford

John Mahlon Marlin (May 6, 1836 – July 1, 1901) was an American firearms manufacturer and inventor.

Marlin was born in Boston Neck, near Windsor Locks, Hartford County, Connecticut, as the son of Mahlon Marlin and Jennette Bradford.

He worked at the Colt plant in Hartford during the American Civil War. Starting in 1863, he made pistols in New Haven, Connecticut, expanding into manufacturing pistols and then different types of firearms by 1872, then called Marlin Fire Arms Company, today Marlin Firearms.

Initially only producing single-shot firearms, his company started manufacturing lever-action repeating rifles in 1881.

Marlin married Martha Susan nee Moore on May 27, 1862, in Windsor Locks. They had four children, two of whom died young. Their sons, Mahlon Henry and John Howard, took over the company after their father's death in 1901.
