= Marlin Model XT-22 =

Marlin Model XT
- Type: Rifle
- Place of origin: United States

Production history
- Manufacturer: Marlin Firearms, Mayfield, Kentucky

Specifications
- Mass: 6 lb (2.7 kg)
- Length: 41 in (1041 mm)
- Barrel length: 22 in (560 mm)
- Cartridge: .17 HMR, .22 LR, .22 WMR, .22 Short, .22 Long
- Caliber: .17, .22
- Action: Bolt action
- Feed system: Box or tubular Magazine (capacities vary)
- Sights: Adjustable rear sight, ramp front sights. Receiver grooved for scope mount, drilled and tapped for scope bases.

The Marlin Model XT is a series of rimfire bolt-action rifles produced by Marlin Firearms, first saw production in 2011. The rifle comes in several different models in both the .17 (XT-17s) and .22 calibers (XT-22s), with either a detachable box magazine or a fixed tubular magazine, and with various stocks and finishes. It has Marlin's patented Micro-Groove riflings, and the Pro-Fire® Adjustable trigger, which is similar to the Savage AccuTrigger.

== Models ==
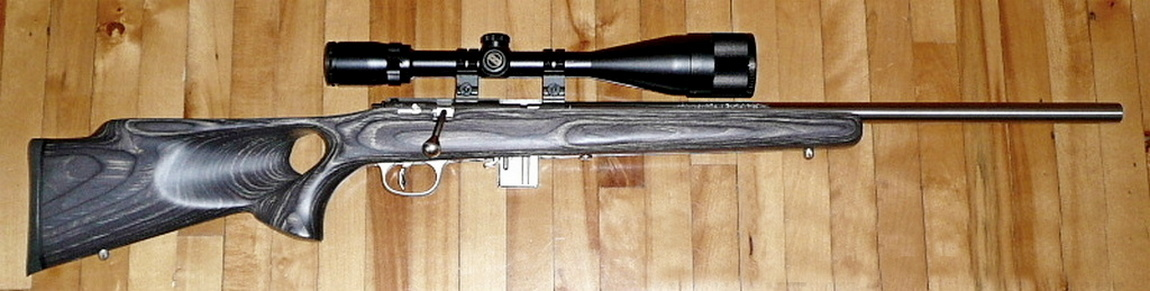
Marlin Model XT-17 VSLB .17 HMR with rifle scope

- XT-22 — Chambered for .22 Long Rifle, 22" blued sporter barrel with 16-groove riflings in 1:16" twist rate, adjustable iron sights, walnut-finished hardwood Monte Carlo comb stock and a 7-shot detachable box magazine, and the receiver grooved, drilled and tapped. Variant models with straight comb black synthetic stocks are named XT-22R
  - XT-22VR — Synthetic stock with heavy varminter barrel with recessed muzzle and no iron sights
  - XT-22YR — The "youth rifle" version of the standard XT-22R, with a shortened 16.25" (instead of 22") blued barrel and 12" (instead of 13.25") length of pull
  - XT-22TR — Black synthetic stock with a 17-shot tubular magazine, also chambered for .22 Short (25-shot) and .22 Long (19-shot). There is also a stainless steel barrel version named XT-22TSR
- XT-22M — Chambered for .22 WMR, 22" blued sporter barrel with 20-groove rifling in 1:16" twist rate and adjustable iron sights, walnut-finished hardwood Monte Carlo comb stock, and either a 4-shot or 7-shot box magazine. Models with straight comb black synthetic stocks are named XT-22MR
  - XT-22MTR — Black synthetic stock with a 12-shot tubular magazine
  - XT-22MTW — Wood stock with a 12-shot tubular magazine
- XT-17R — Chambered for .17 HMR, 22" blued sporter barrel with 1:9" twist rate and adjustable iron sights, black synthetic stock, and either a 4-shot or 7-shot box magazine
  - XT-17V — Blued heavy varminter barrel with no iron sights, with walnut-finished hardwood Monte Carlo comb stock. There are also a synthetic stock version named XT-17VR and a stainless steel version with laminated hardwood stock named XT-17VSL
  - XT-17VSLB — Stainless steel heavy varminter barrel with no iron sights, with grey laminate thumbhole stock
