= Magazine (firearms) =

Ammunition feeding device of a firearm

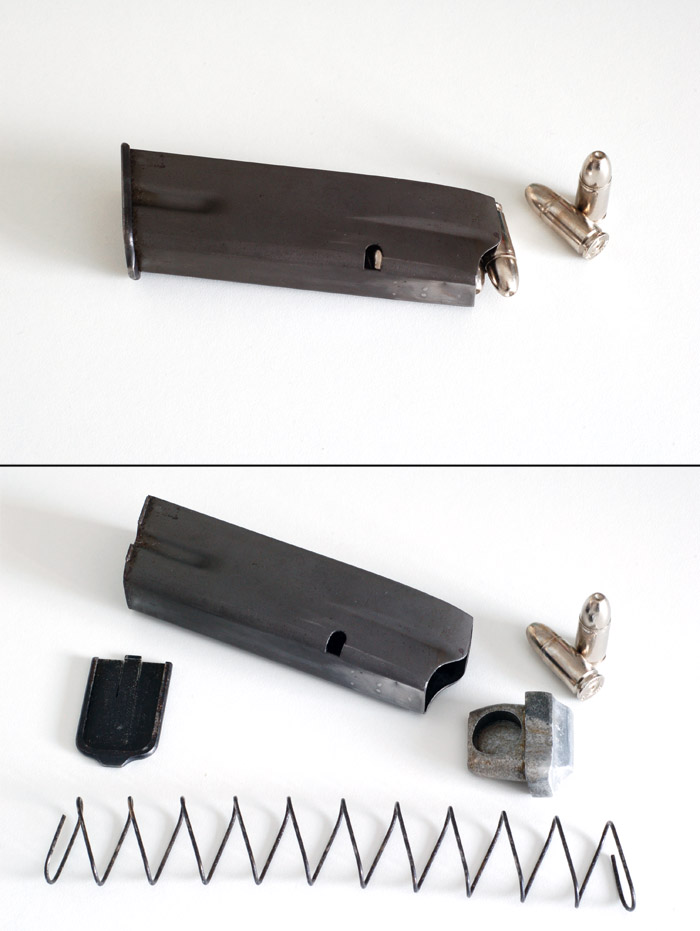
A staggered-column 9×19mm Browning Hi-Power pistol box magazine. The top image shows the magazine loaded and ready for use, while the lower image shows it unloaded and disassembled.

Loading of small arms ammunition into a magazine.

A magazine is an ammunition storage and feeding device for a repeating firearm, either integral with the gun (internal or fixed external) or detachable. The magazine functions by holding several cartridges within itself and sequentially pushing each one into a position where it may be readily loaded into the barrel chamber by the firearm's moving action. The detachable magazine is sometimes colloquially referred to as a "clip," although this is technically inaccurate since a clip is actually an accessory device used to help load ammunition into the magazine or cylinder of a firearm.

Magazines come in many different shapes and sizes from integral tubular magazines on lever-action and pump-action rifles and shotguns that may hold more than 5 rounds to detachable box magazines and drum magazines for automatic rifles and light machine guns that may hold more than 50 rounds. Various jurisdictions ban magazines over a certain capacity – for example, in Canada, more than 5 rounds for rifles or shotguns and more than ten rounds for handguns.

== Nomenclature ==
With the increased use of semi-automatic and automatic firearms, the detachable magazine became increasingly common. Soon after the adoption of the M1911 pistol, the term "magazine" was settled on by the military and firearms experts. Although the term "clip" is often used to refer to detachable (never fixed) magazines, this usage remains a point of strong contention. The defining difference between a clip and a magazine is the presence of a feed mechanism, typically a spring-loaded follower, which a clip lacks.

== History ==
The earliest firearms were loaded with powder and a lead ball in paper, and to fire more than a single shot without reloading required multiple barrels, such as in pepper-box guns, double-barreled rifles, double-barreled shotguns, or multiple chambers, such as in revolvers. The main problem with these solutions is that they increase the bulk and/or weight of a firearm, over a firearm with a single barrel and/or single chamber. However, many attempts were made to get multiple shots from loading a single barrel through the use of superposed loads. While some early repeaters such as the Kalthoff repeater operated using complex systems with multiple feed sources for ball, powder, and primer, easily mass-produced repeating mechanisms did not appear until self-contained cartridges were developed in the 19th century.

=== Early tubular magazines ===
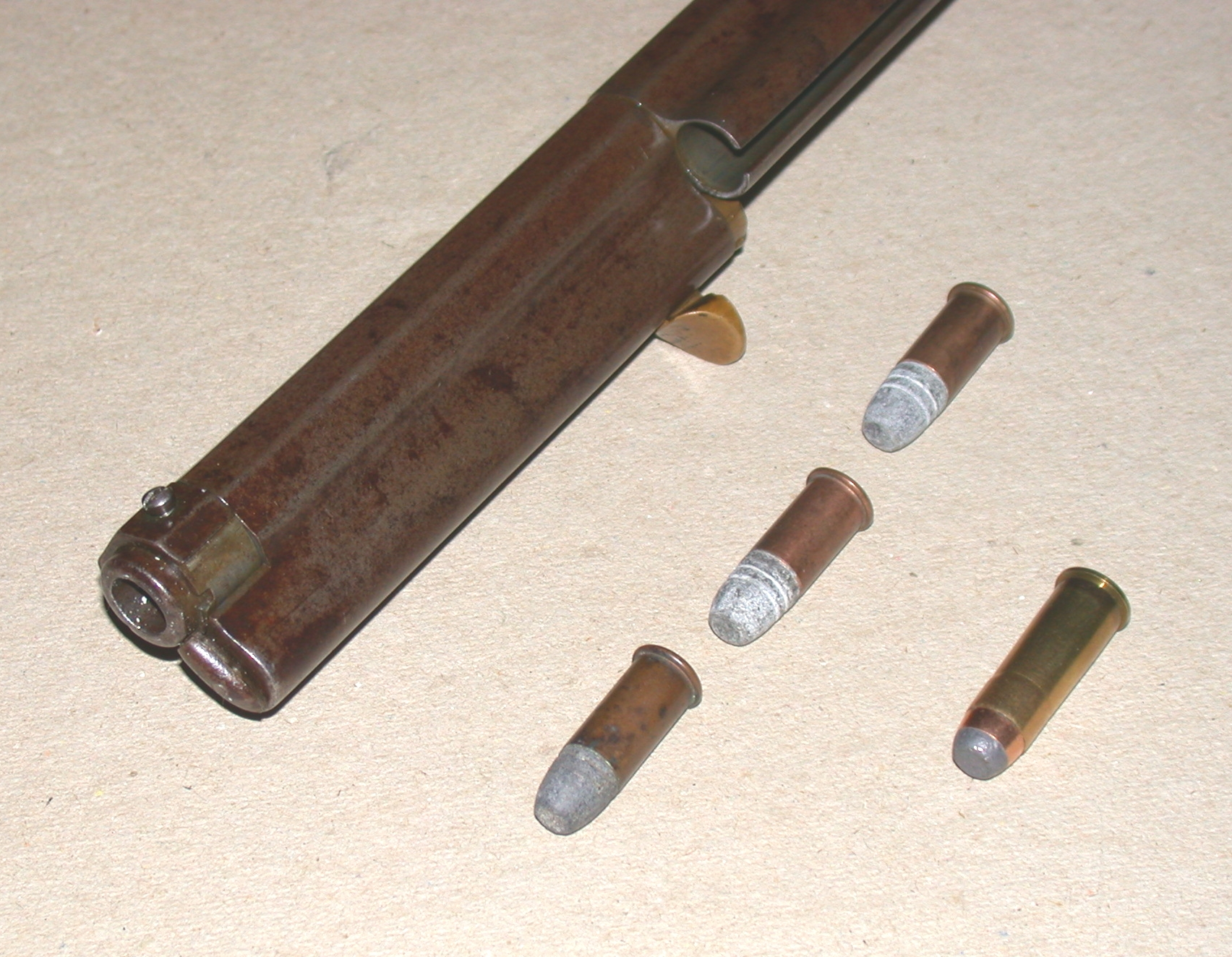
Loading sleeve open, three Henry Flat cartridges, compare with .44 WCF round

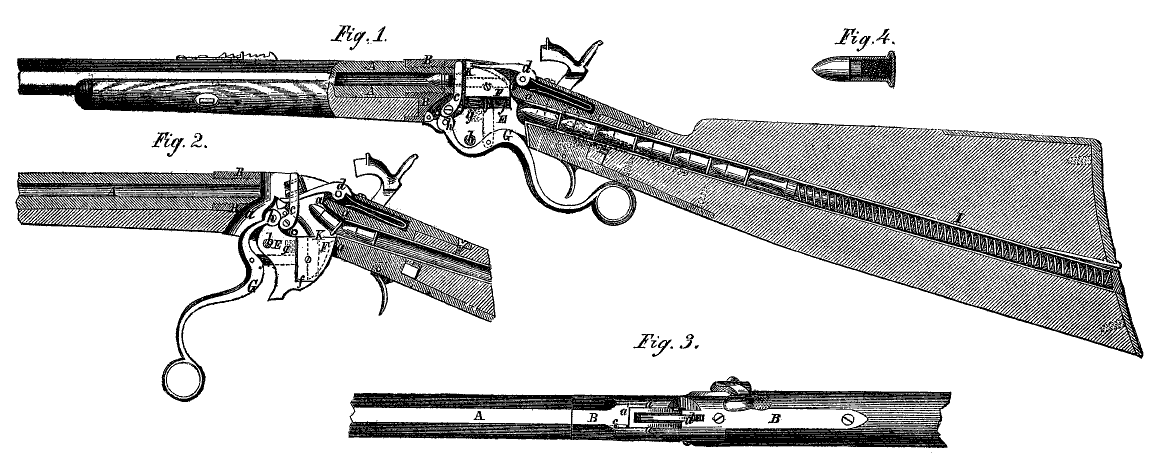
Diagram of the Spencer rifle showing the tubular magazine in the butt

The first successful mass-produced repeating weapon to use a "tubular magazine" permanently mounted to the weapon was the Austrian Army's Girardoni air rifle, first produced in 1779.

The first mass-produced repeating firearm was the Volcanic Rifle which used a hollow bullet with the base filled with powder and primer fed into the chamber from a tube called a "magazine" with an integral spring to push the cartridges in to the action, thence to be loaded into the chamber and fired. It was named after a building or room used to store ammunition. The anemic power of the Rocket Ball ammunition used in the Volcanic doomed it to limited popularity..

The Henry repeating rifle is a lever-action, breech-loading, tubular magazine-fed repeating rifle, and was an improved version of the earlier Volcanic rifle. Designed by Benjamin Tyler Henry in 1860, it was one of the first firearms to use self-contained metallic cartridges. The Henry was introduced in 1860 and was in production until 1866 in the United States by the New Haven Arms Company. It was adopted in small quantities by the Union Army in the American Civil War and was favored for its greater firepower than the standard issue carbine. Many later found their way Westward and was famed both for its use at the Battle of the Little Bighorn, and being the basis for the iconic Winchester lever-action repeating rifle, which is still in production to the present day. The Henry and Winchester rifles would go on to see service with a number of militaries including Turkey. Switzerland and Italy adopted similar designs.

The second magazine-fed firearm to achieve widespread success was the Spencer repeating rifle, which was designed by Christopher Miner Spencer in 1860, also saw military service during the American Civil War. The Spencer used a tubular magazine located in the butt of the gun instead of under the barrel and it used rimfire metallic cartridges. The Spencer was successful, but the rimfire ammunition did occasionally ignite in the magazine tube and destroy the magazine. It could also injure or kill the user.

The new bolt-action rifles began to gain favor with militaries in the mid-1880s and were often equipped with tubular magazines. The Mauser Model 1871 was originally a single-shot action that added a tubular magazine in its 1884 update. The Norwegian Jarmann M1884 was adopted in 1884 and also used a tubular magazine. The French Lebel Model 1886 rifle also used 8-round tubular magazine.

Tubular magazines remain in common use on many types of shotguns, including some rifles.

=== Integral box magazines ===
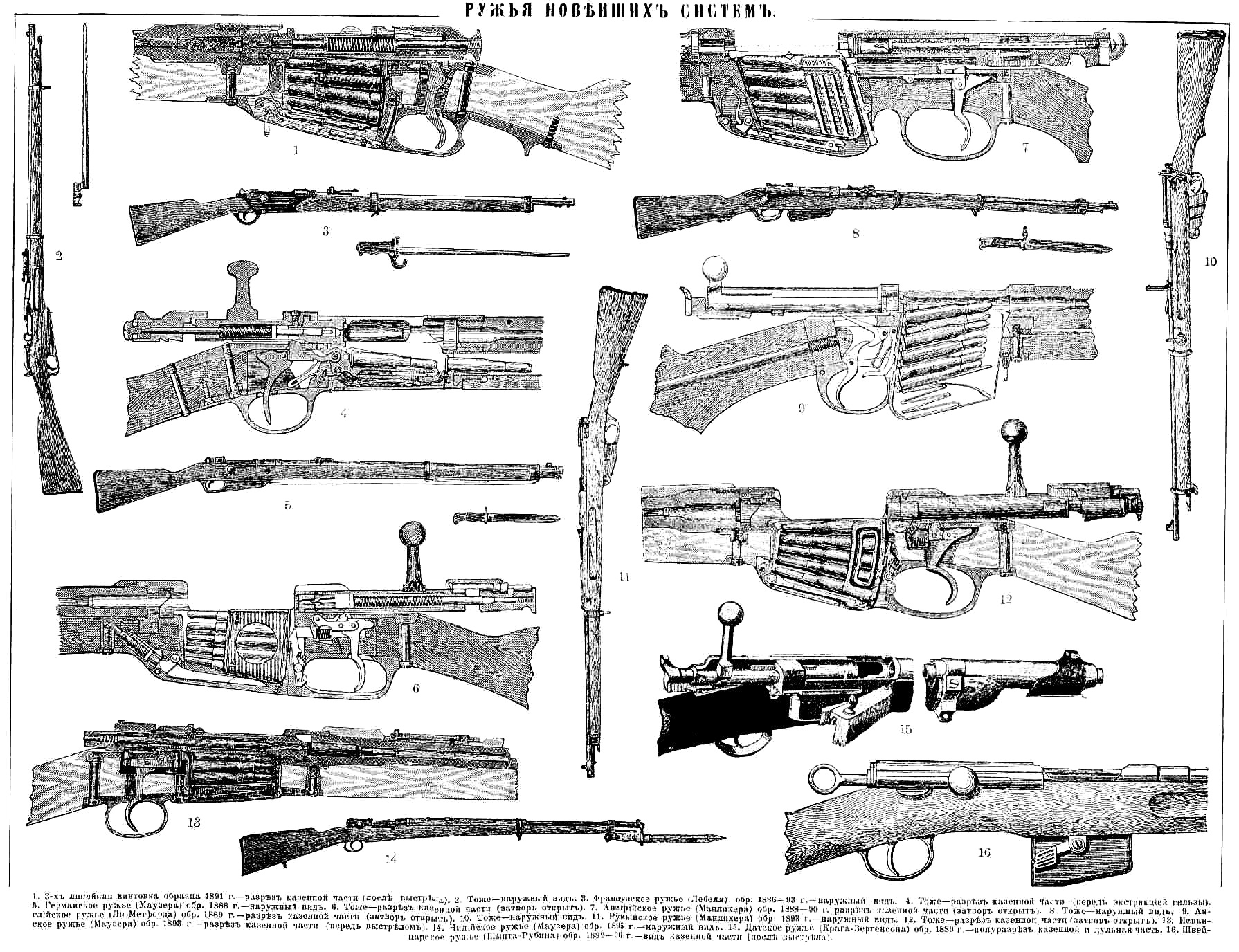
1905 Military Rifles magazines. 1 & 2: Mosin–Nagant M1891 3 & 4: Lebel M1886 5 & 6: Gewehr M1888 7 & 8: Mannlicher M1888 9 & 10: Lee–Metford M1888 11 & 12: Dutch-Mannlicher M1895 13 & 14: Mauser M1893 15: Krag–Jørgensen M1886 16: Schmidt–Rubin M1889

The military cartridge was evolving as the magazine rifle evolved. Cartridges evolved from large-bores (.40 caliber/10 mm and larger) to smaller bores that fired lighter, higher-velocity bullets and incorporated new smokeless propellants. The Lebel Model 1886 rifle was the first rifle and cartridge to be designed for use with smokeless powder and used an 8 mm wadcutter-shaped bullet that was drawn from a tubular magazine. This would later become a problem when the Lebel's ammunition was updated to use a more aerodynamic pointed bullet. Modifications had to be made to the centerfire case to prevent the spitzer point from igniting the primer of the next cartridge inline in the magazine through recoil or simply rough handling. This remains a concern with lever-action firearms today. It became apparent that the tubular magazine is generally unsuitable for storage of pointed bullet cartridges, and hence the need for a different magazine design.

Two early box magazine patents were the ones by Rollin White in 1855 and William Harding in 1859. A detachable box magazine was patented in 1864 by the American Robert Wilson, however, unlike later box magazines this magazine fed into a tube magazine and was located in the stock of the gun. Another box magazine, closer to the modern type, though non-detachable, was patented in Britain (No. 483) by Mowbray Walker, George Henry Money and Francis Little in 1867.

James Paris Lee patented a box magazine which held rounds stacked vertically in 1875, 1879 and 1882, and was first adopted by Austria in the form of an 11mm straight-pull bolt-action rifle, the Mannlicher M1886, possibly the first serially produced rifle with a box magazine. It also used a cartridge clip which held 5 rounds ready to load into the magazine.

The bolt-action Krag–Jørgensen rifle, designed in Norway in 1886, used a unique rotary magazine that was built into the receiver. Like Lee's box magazine, the rotary magazine held the rounds side-by-side, rather than end-to-end. Like most rotary magazines, it was loaded through a loading gate one round at a time, this one located on the side of the receiver. While reliable, the Krag–Jørgensen's magazine was expensive to produce and slow to reload. It was adopted by only three countries, Denmark in 1889, the United States in 1892, and Norway in 1894.

==== Clip-fed revolution ====
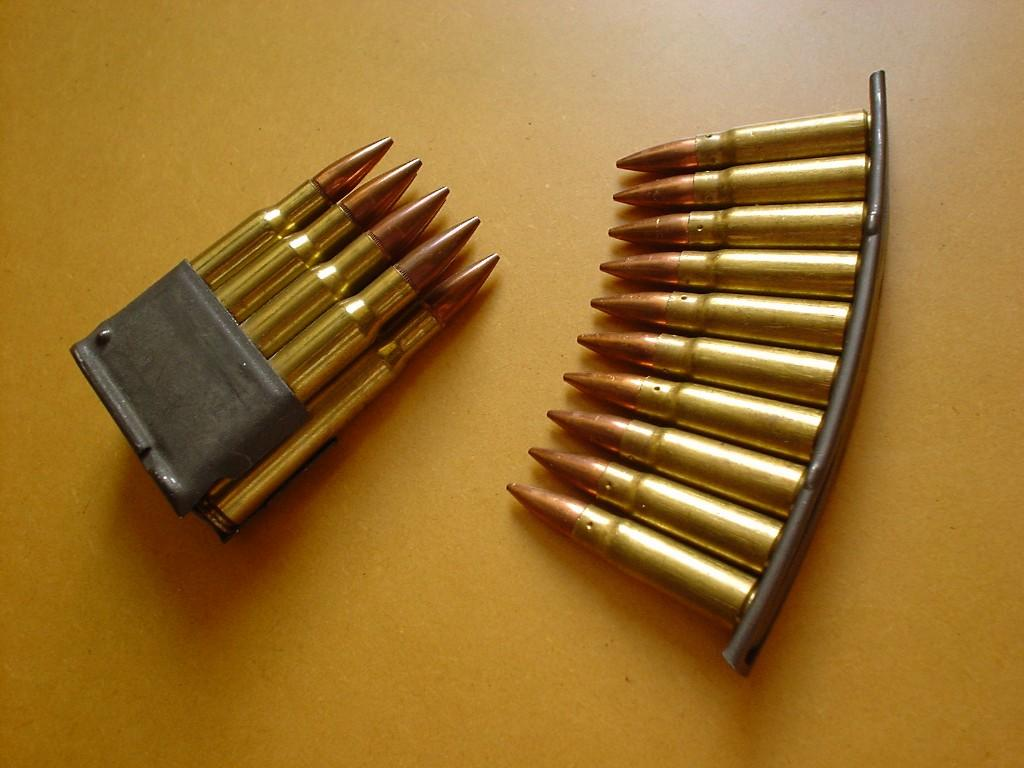
Comparison of M1 Garand en bloc clip (left), and SKS stripper clip (right)

A clip (called a charger in the United Kingdom) is a device that is used to store multiple rounds of ammunition together as a unit, ready for insertion into the magazine or cylinder of a firearm. This speeds up the process of reloading the firearm as several rounds can be loaded at once, rather than one round being loaded at a time. Several different types of clips exist, most of which are made of inexpensive metal stampings that are designed to be disposable, though they are often re-used.

The first clips used were of the en bloc variety, developed by Ferdinand Mannlicher for the Mannlicher M1886 rifle and first adopted by the Austro-Hungarian Army, which would be used during the first world war in the form of the Mannlicher M1895, derivatives of which would be adopted by many national militaries. The Germans used this system for their Model 1888 Commission Rifle, featuring a 5-round en bloc clip-fed integral box magazine. One problem with the en bloc system is that the firearm cannot be practically used without a ready supply of (mostly disposable) clips. Paul Mauser would solve this problem by introducing a stripper clip that functioned only to assist the user in loading the magazine quickly: it was not required to load the magazine to full capacity. He would continue to make improved models of rifles that took advantage of this new clip design from 1889 through 1898 in various calibers that proved enormously successful, and were adopted by a wide range of national militaries. In 1890 the French adopted the 8mm Lebel Berthier rifles with 3-round integral magazines, fed from en bloc clips; the empty clips were pushed from the bottom of the action by the insertion of a loaded clip from the top.

In the late 19th century, there were many short-lived designs, such as the M1895 Lee Navy and Gewehr 1888, eventually replaced by the M1903 Springfield rifle and Gewehr 98 respectively. The Russian Mosin–Nagant, adopted in 1891, was an exception. It was not revolutionary; it was a bolt-action rifle, used a small-bore smokeless powder cartridge, and a fixed box magazine loaded from the top with stripper clips, all of which were features that were used in earlier military rifles. What made the Nagant stand out was that it combined all the earlier features in a form that was to last virtually unchanged from its issue by Russia in 1894 through World War II and with its sniper rifle variants still in use today.

==== Magazine cut-off ====
A feature of many late 19th and early 20th century bolt-action rifles was the magazine cut-off, sometimes called a feed interrupter. This was a mechanical device that prevented the rifle from loading a round from the magazine, requiring the shooter to manually load each individual round as he fired, saving the rounds in the magazine for short periods of rapid fire when ordered to use them. Most military authorities that specified them assumed that their riflemen would waste ammunition indiscriminately if allowed to load from the magazine all the time. By the mid-20th century, most manufacturers deleted this feature to save costs and manufacturing time; it is also likely that battlefield experience had proven the futility of this philosophy.

==== Final fixed-magazine developments ====
One of the last new clip-fed, fixed-magazine rifles widely adopted that was not a modification of an earlier rifle was the M1 Garand. The M1 Garand was the first gas-operated semi-automatic rifle adopted and issued in large numbers as the standard service rifle of any military in the world. The M1 Garand was fed by a special eight-round en bloc clip. The clip itself was inserted into the rifle's magazine during loading, where it was locked in place. The rounds were fed directly from the clip, with a spring-loaded follower in the rifle pushing the rounds up into feeding position. When empty, the bolt would lock open, and a spring would automatically eject the empty clip with a distinctive pinging sound, leaving the rifle ready to be quickly reloaded. The M14 rifle, which was based on incremental changes to the Garand action, switched to a detachable box magazine. However, the M14 with magazine attached could also be loaded via 5-round stripper-clips.

The Soviet SKS carbine, which entered service in 1945, was something of a stopgap between the semi-automatic service rifles being developed in the period leading up to World War II, and the new assault rifle developed by the Germans. The SKS used a fixed magazine, holding ten rounds and fed by a conventional stripper clip. It was a modification of the earlier AVS-36 rifle, shortened and chambered for the new reduced power 7.62×39mm cartridge. It was rendered obsolete for military use almost immediately by the 1947 introduction of the magazine-fed AK-47 assault rifle, though it remained in service for many years in Soviet Bloc nations alongside the AK-47. The detachable magazine quickly came to dominate post-war military rifle designs.

=== Detachable box magazines ===
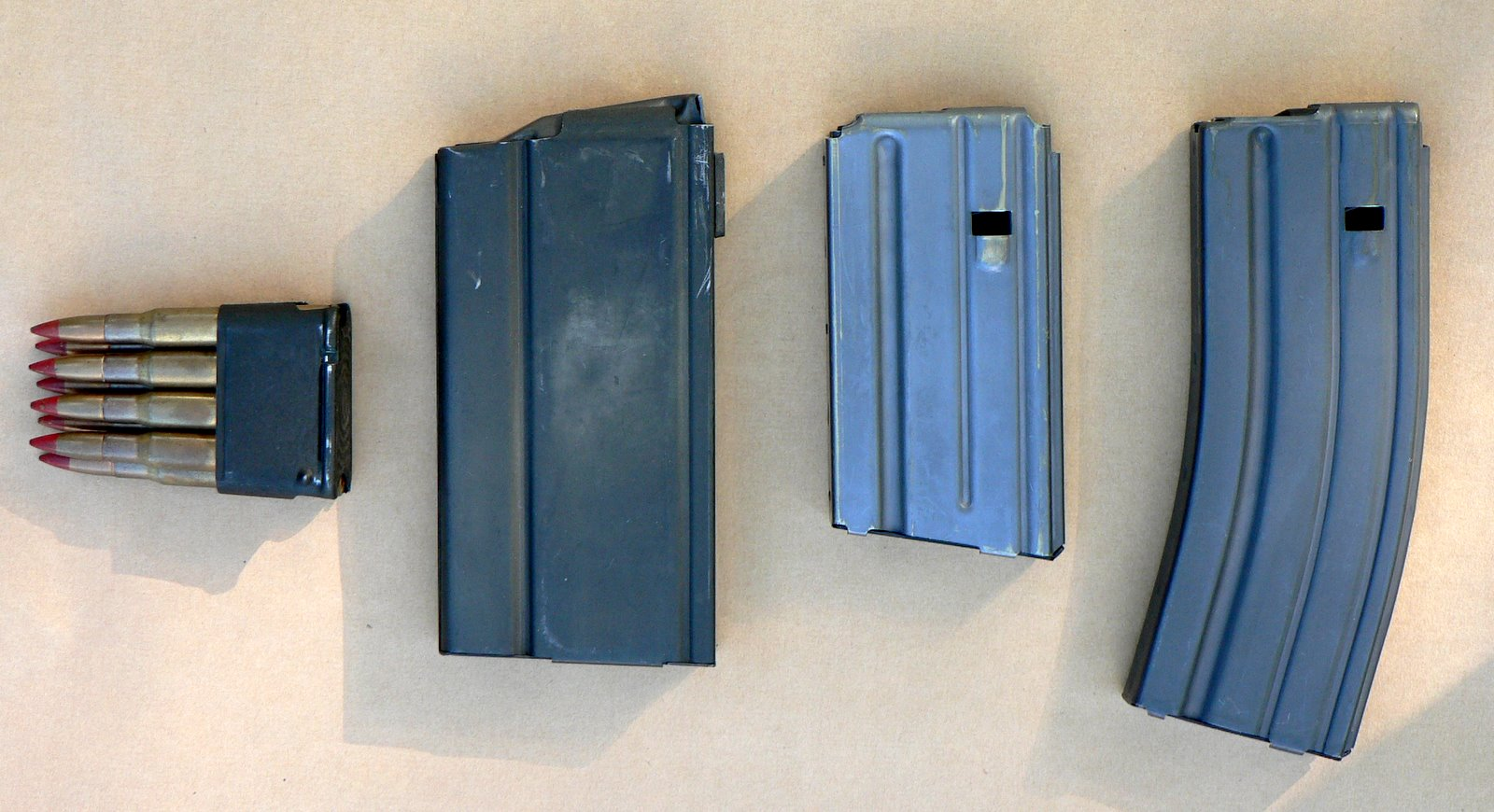
(left to right) M1 Garand 8-round en bloc clip, M14 20-round magazine, M16 STANAG 20- and 30-round magazines

Firearms using detachable magazines are made with an opening known as a magazine well into which the detachable magazine is inserted. The magazine well locks the magazine in position for feeding cartridges into the chamber of the firearm, and requires a device known as a magazine release to allow the magazine to be separated from the firearm.

The M1879 Remington–Lee was the first rifle with a successful detachable box magazine design. Its followup, the Lee–Metford rifle, developed in 1888, also has a detachable box magazine, and the spare one could be optionally worn on soldier equipment, although with the adoption of the Short Magazine Lee–Enfield Mk I this became only detachable for cleaning and not swapped to reload the weapon.

The first completely modern removable box magazine was patented in 1908 by Arthur Savage for the Savage Model 99 (1899), although it was not implemented on the 99 until 1965. James Paris Lee's patent of November 4, 1879, Number 221,328 would have been before Arthur Savage's magazine.

Lee's magazine was also used on the Remington Lee model 1899 factory sporting rifle. Other guns did not adopt all of its features until his patent expired in 1942: It has shoulders to retain cartridges when it is removed from the rifle. It operates reliably with cartridges of different lengths. It is insertable and removable at any time with any number of cartridges. These features allow the operator to reload the gun infrequently, carry magazines rather than loose cartridges, and to easily change the types of cartridges in the field. The magazine is assembled from inexpensive stamped sheet metal. It also includes a crucial safety feature for hunting dangerous game: when empty the follower (Note: The "follower" is the sheet metal part between the last cartridge and the spring. It might be made of or coated with other materials such as nylon or Teflon.) stops the bolt from engaging the chamber, informing the operator that the gun is empty before any attempt to fire.

The first successful semi-automatic pistol was the Borchardt C-93 (1893) and incorporated detachable box magazines. Nearly all subsequent semiautomatic pistol designs adopted detachable box magazines.

The Swiss Army evaluated the Luger pistol using a detachable box magazine in 7.65×21mm Parabellum and adopted it in 1900 as its standard sidearm. The Luger pistol was accepted by the Imperial German Navy in 1904. This version is known as Pistole 04 (or P.04). In 1908 the German Army adopted the Luger to replace the Reichsrevolver in front-line service. The Pistole 08 (or P.08) was chambered in 9×19mm Parabellum. The P.08 was the usual side arm for German Army personnel in both World Wars.

The M1911 semi-automatic pistol set the standard for most modern handguns and likewise the mechanics of the handgun magazine. In most handguns the magazine follower engages a slide-stop to hold the slide back and keep the firearm out of battery when the magazine is empty and all rounds fired. Upon inserting a loaded magazine, the user depresses the slide stop, throwing the slide forward, stripping a round from the top of the magazine stack and chambering it. In single-action pistols this action keeps the hammer cocked back as the new round is chambered, keeping the gun ready to begin firing again.

During World War One, detachable box magazines found favor, being used in all manner of firearms, such as pistols, light-machine guns, submachine guns, semi-automatic and automatic rifles. However, after the War to End All Wars, military planners failed to recognize the importance of automatic rifles and detachable box magazine concept, and instead maintained their traditional views and preference for clip-fed bolt-action rifles. As a result, many promising new automatic rifle designs that used detachable box magazines were abandoned.

As World War II loomed, most of the world's major powers began to develop submachine guns fed by 20- to 40-round detachable box magazines. However, of the major powers, only the United States would adopt a general-issue semi-automatic rifle that used detachable box magazines: the M1 carbine with its 15-round magazines. As the war progressed the Germans developed the Sturmgewehr 44 assault rifle concept with its 30-round detachable magazine. After WWII, automatic weapons using detachable box magazines were developed and used by all of the world's armies. Today, detachable box magazines are the norm and they are so widely used that they are simply referred to as magazines or "mags" for short.

=== Double-stack magazines ===
The earliest examples of double-stack, single-feed box magazine patents are by the Austro-Hungarian Karl Krnka in July 1888, and the English inventor Joseph James Speed of Waltham Cross in November 1888. The earliest double-feed examples are by the British George Vincent Fosbery in 1883 and 1884, Schweizerische Industries-Gesellschaft, better known as SIG Sauer, in March 1887, and Fritz von Stepski and Erich Sterzinger of Austria-Hungary in November 1888.

One of the earliest rifles with a double-stack staggered-feed magazine is the 1889 Schmidt-Rubin. James Paris Lee is sometimes claimed to have invented the double-stack, staggered-feed detachable box magazine but he did not design one until 1892 for the Mark II Lee-Metford, three years after the Schmidt-Rubin.

The first pistol with a double-stack, staggered-feed magazine was the Mauser C96 although it was an integral design fed by stripper clips and located in front of the grip rather than in the modern configuration of in the grip. A detachable, double-stack staggered-feed box magazine was used in the Bergmann Mars pistol, designed in 1903, but it too was in front of the grip rather than in it. The first detachable double-stack, single-feed magazine in the grip for pistols was probably the one patented by the American Elbert H. Searle in 1904 and adopted by Arthur Savage though he did not apply it in practice to his designs until much later.

During World War One, Schmeisser's Cone was invented in 1916 by Hugo Schmeisser which allowed high-capacity double-stack, single-feed box magazine using guns to function reliably although it wasn't implemented on any of his designs until after the war. The first reliable high-capacity double-stack, staggered-feed box magazine was developed by the American designer Oscar V. Payne for the Thompson submachine gun around the same time as Schmeisser's Cone.

== Function and types ==
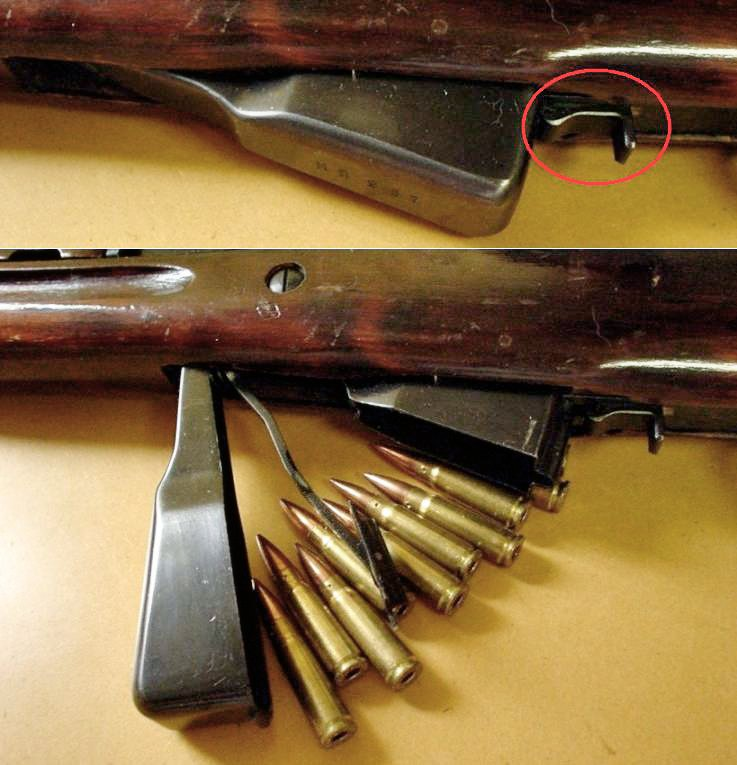
SKS integral box magazine

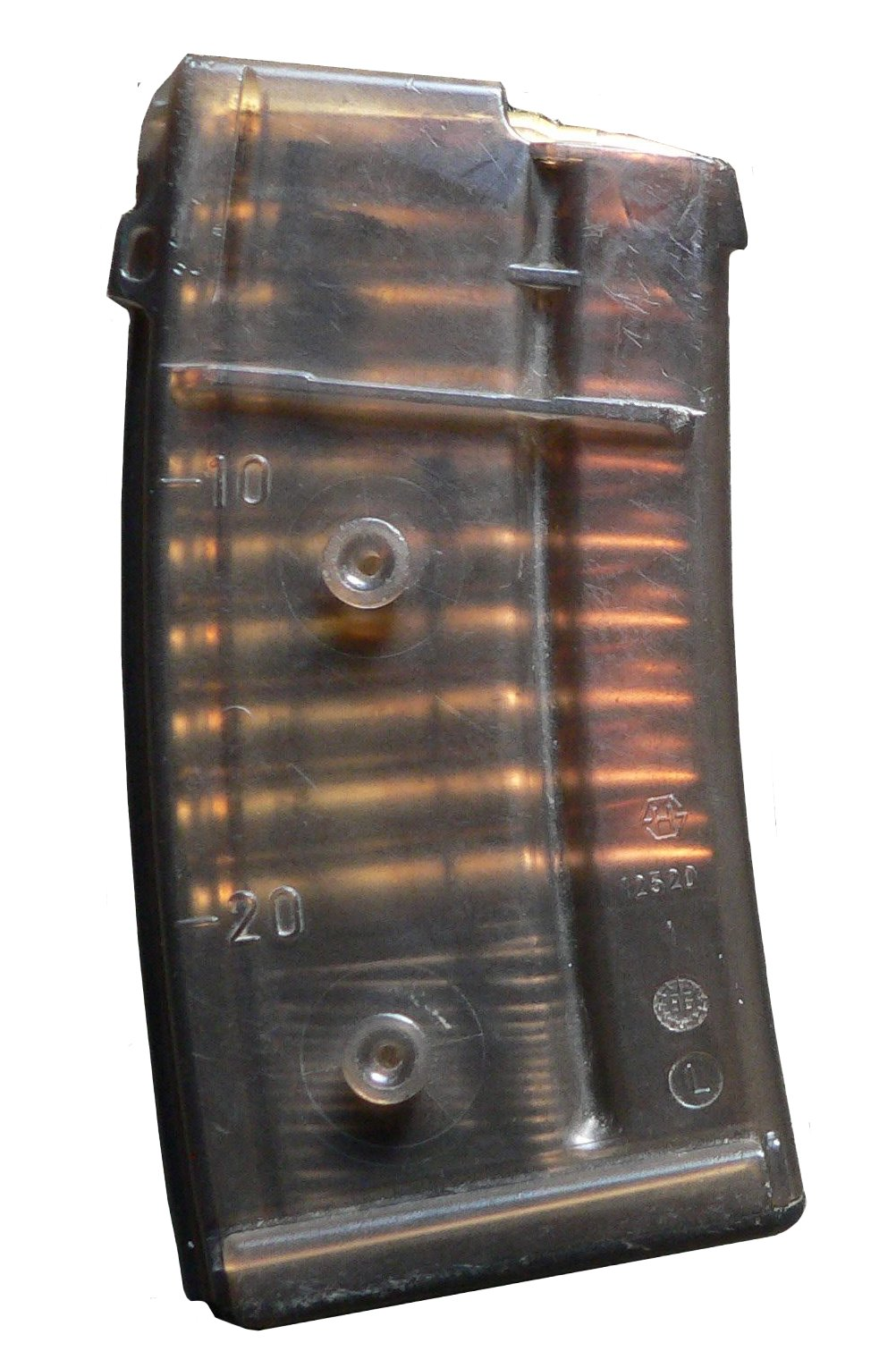
Detachable box magazine for a SIG SG 550 with studs for stacking multiple magazines together.

All cartridge-based single-barrel firearms designed to fire more than a single round of ammunition without manual reloading require some form of magazine designed to store and feed cartridges into the firearm's action. Magazines come in many shapes and sizes, with the most common type in modern firearms being the detachable box type. Most magazines designed for use with a reciprocating bolt firearm (tube fed firearms being the exception) make use of a set of feed lips which stop the vertical motion of the cartridges out of the magazine but allow one cartridge at a time to be pushed forward (stripped) out of the feed lips by the firearm's bolt into the chamber. Some form of spring and follower combination is almost always used to feed cartridges to the lips which can be located either in the magazine (most removable box magazines) or built into the firearm (fixed box magazines). There are also two distinct styles to feed lips. In a single-feed design the top cartridge touches both lips and is commonly used in single-column box magazines, while a staggered feed magazine (sometimes called "double-feed" magazine, not to be confused with the firearm malfunction) consists of a wider set of lips so that the second cartridge in line forces the top cartridge against one of the lips. The staggered-feed design has proven more resistant to jamming in use with double-column magazines than single-feed variants, since the narrowing of a magazine tube to a single-feed induces extra friction which the magazine springs needs to overcome. Some magazine types are strongly associated with certain firearm types, such as the fixed "tubular" magazine found on most modern lever-action rifles and pump-action shotguns. A firearm using detachable magazines may accept a variety of types of magazine, such as the Thompson submachine gun, most variations of which would accept box or drum magazines. Some types of firearm, such as the M249 and other squad automatic weapons, can feed from both magazines and belts.

=== Tubular ===
Many of the first repeating rifles and shotguns, particularly lever-action rifles and pump-action shotguns, used magazines that stored cartridges nose-to-end inside of a spring-loaded tube that typically ran parallel underneath the barrel or inside of the buttstock. Tubular magazines are also commonly used in .22 caliber bolt-action rimfire rifles, such as the Marlin Model XT. Tubular magazines and centerfire cartridges with pointed (spitzer) bullets present a safety issue: a pointed bullet may (through the forces of recoil or simply rough handling) strike the next round's primer and ignite that round or even other rounds via chain ignition within the magazine. The Winchester Model 1873 used blunt-nosed centerfire cartridges such as the .44-40 Winchester. Certain modern rifle cartridges using soft-pointed plastic tips have been designed to avoid this problem while improving the aerodynamic qualities of the bullet to match those available in bolt-action designs, therefore extending the effective range of lever-actions.

=== Box ===
Left: single-column, single-feed (aka single-stack, single-feed) detachable box magazine.Centre: double-column, single feed (aka staggered-stack, single-feed) detachable box magazine. Right: double-column, double-feed (aka staggered-stack, staggered-feed) detachable box magazine.

The most popular type of magazine in modern rifles and handguns, box magazines, arrange the cartridges in columns, either in a single stack or in a double-column or double-stack staggered (zigzag) fashion providing about twice the capacity of a single-stack magazine of the same length. As the firearm cycles, a spring-loaded follower drives the cartridges toward the end of the magazine, ultimately terminating in either a single position (center-feed) or alternating between left and right positions (staggered-feed). Box magazines may be integral to the firearm or removable:

- An integral box or fixed box magazine (also known as a blind box magazine when lacking a removable floorplate) is built into the firearm and is not easily removable. This type of magazine is found most often on bolt-action rifles. An integral box magazine is usually charged through the action, one round at a time. Military rifles often use stripper clips, a.k.a. chargers, permitting multiple rounds, commonly with 5 or 10 at a time, to be loaded in rapid sequence. Some integral box magazines use en bloc clips that are loaded into the magazine with the ammunition and that are ejected from the firearm when empty.
- A detachable box magazine is a self-contained mechanism capable of being loaded or unloaded while detached from the host firearm. They are attached via a slot in the firearm receiver, usually below the action, to the side of the action, or on top of the action. When necessary, the magazine can easily be detached from the firearm and replaced by another. This significantly speeds the process of reloading, allowing the operator quick access to ammunition. This type of magazine may be straight or curved. Detachable box magazines may be metal or plastic. The plastic magazines are sometimes partially transparent so the operator can easily check the remaining ammunition. Box magazines are often affixed to each other with clamps, clips, tape, straps, or built-in studs to facilitate faster reloading: see jungle style.

There are, however, exceptions to these rules. The Lee–Enfield rifle had a detachable box magazine only to facilitate cleaning. The Lee–Enfield magazine did open, permitting rapid unloading of the magazine without having to operate the bolt-action repeatedly to unload the magazine. Other designs, such as the Breda Modello 30, had a fixed protruding magazine from the right side that resembled a conventional detachable box, but it was not detachable and was reloaded by using 20 round stripper clips.

Box magazines may come in straight, angled, or curved forms depending on whether the cartridges are tapered rimmed/rimless or bottlenecked. Straight or slightly curved magazines work well with straight-sided rimless cartridges, angled magazines work well with straight-sided rimmed or rimless cartridges, and curved magazines work well with rimmed/rimless tapered cartridges.

Pistol magazines are most often found with single-stack or double-stack, single-feed, which may be due to this design being slimmer at the top, which can simplify the design of the pistol frame inregard to its grip thickness.

==== Horizontal ====
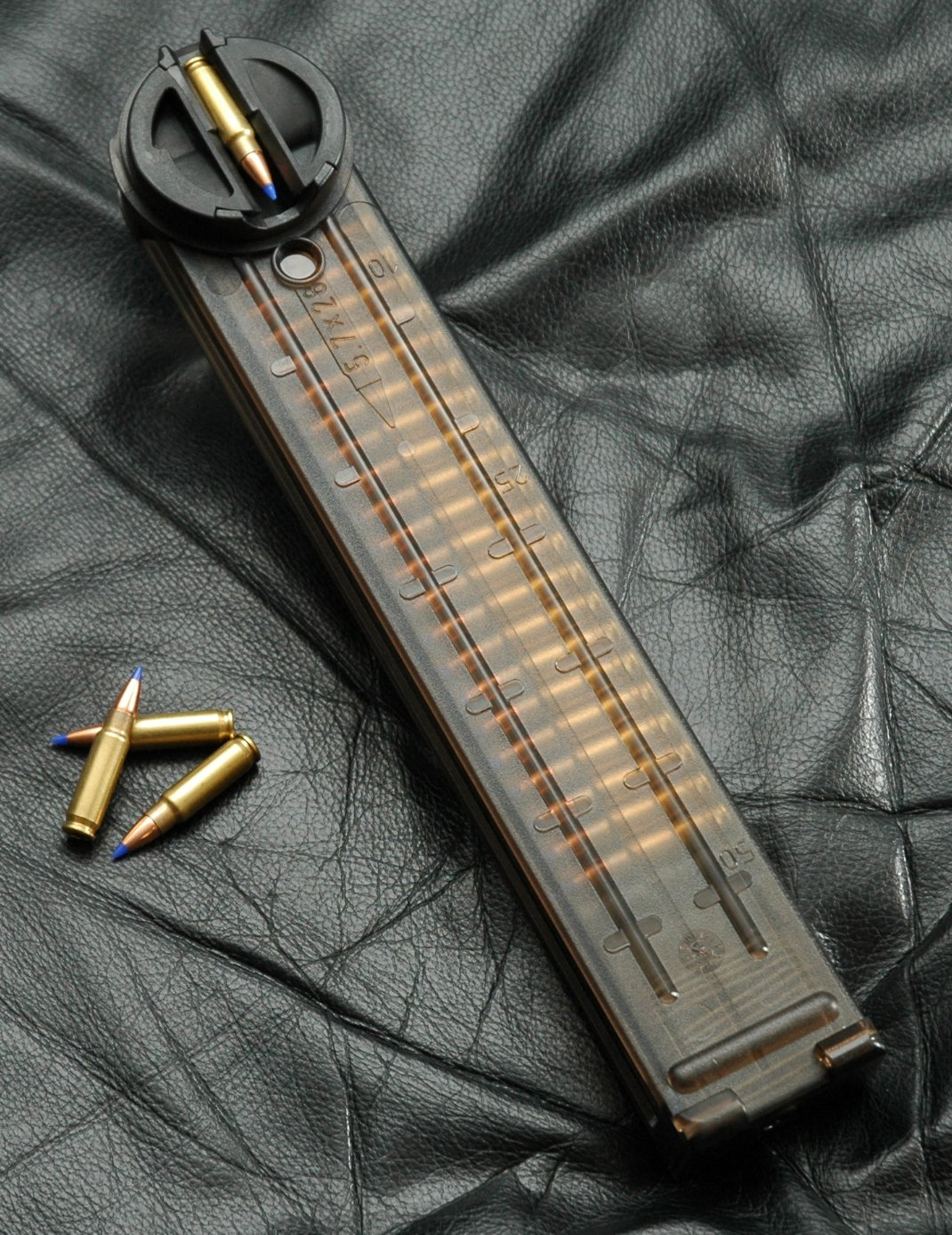
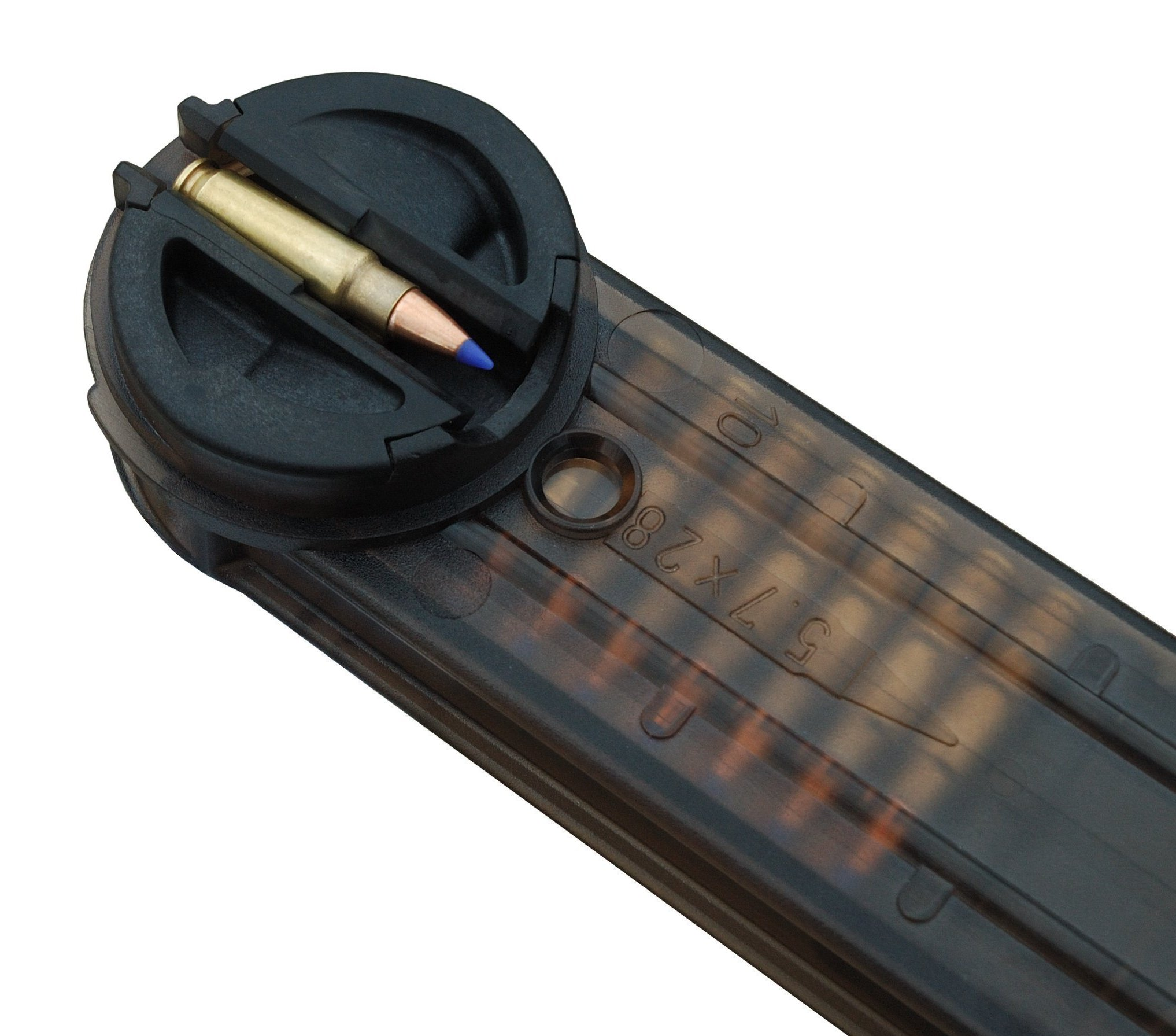
The P90's magazine has a capacity of 50 rounds and fits flush with the weapon's frame.

The FN P90, Kel-Tec P50, and AR-57 personal defense weapons use horizontally mounted feeding systems. The magazine sits parallel to the barrel, fitting flush with the top of the receiver, and the ammunition is rotated 90 degrees by a spiral feed ramp before being chambered. The Heckler & Koch G11, an experimental assault rifle that implements caseless ammunition, also functions similarly with the magazine aligned horizontally over the barrel. Rather than being positioned laterally to the barrel like with the aforementioned examples, ammunition is positioned vertically with the bullet facing downward at a 90-degree angle relative to the barrel where it is fed into a rotary chamber before firing. The AR-57, also known as the AR Five-seven, is an upper receiver for the AR-15 rifle lower receiver, firing FN 5.7×28mm rounds from standard FN P90 magazines.

==== Casket ====
Diagram of the Spectre M4 casket magazine

Another form of box magazine, sometimes referred to as a "quad-column" or "quad-stack", a casket magazine can hold a large amount of ammunition. It is wider than a standard box magazine, but retains the same length. Casket magazines can be found on the Suomi KP/-31, Hafdasa C-4, Spectre M4, QCW-05 and on 5.45×39mm AK rifle derivatives, and now the Kel-Tec CP33 as well. In 2009, Magpul was granted a patent for a high capacity, non-drum magazine, and such a magazine was also debuted by SureFire in December 2010, and is now sold as the MAG5-60 and MAG5-100 high capacity magazine (HCM) in 60 and 100 round capacities, respectively, in 5.56mm for AR-15 compatible with M4/M16/AR-15 variants and other firearms that accept STANAG 4179 magazines. Izhmash has also developed a casket magazine for the AK-12. Desert Tech have also released the QMAG-53 compatible Quattro-15 lower receiver for the AR-15.

==== Tandem ====
A tandem magazine is a type of box magazine with another magazine placed in front. When firing, the bolt travels farther back past the front section magazine until the rear section is empty, then uses the front section. Firearms using tandem magazines are the Special Purpose Individual Weapon (SPIW), Sunngård pistol, Gerasimenko VAG-73 and the Volkov-Chukhmatov submachine gun. The Mimic Speed9 uses a back-to-back tandem magazine.

=== Rotary ===
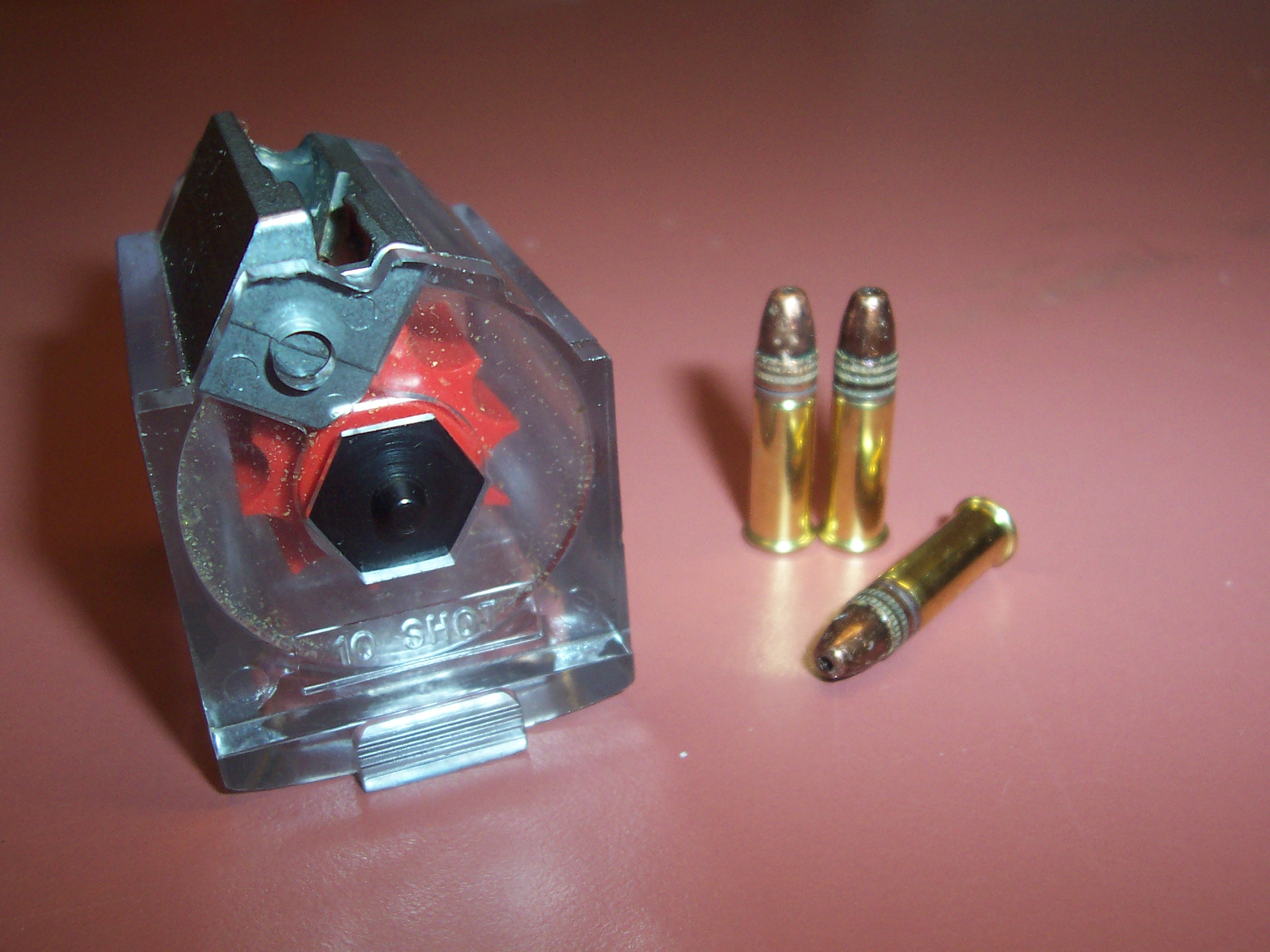
Ruger 10/22's BX-1CLR rotary magazine

The rotary (or spool) magazine consists of a cylindrical sprocket actuated by a torsion spring, with cartridges fitting between the tooth bar of the sprocket, which is mounted on a spindle parallel to the bore axis and rotates each round sequentially into the feeding position. Rotary magazines may be fixed or detachable, and are usually of low capacity, generally 5 to 10 rounds, depending on the caliber used. John Smith patented a rotary magazine in 1856. Another rotary magazine was produced by Sylvester Roper in 1866 and was also used in the weapons by Anton Spitalsky and the Savage Model 1892. Otto Schönauer first patented a spool magazine in 1886 and his later design, patented in 1900, was used on bolt-action rifles produced at least until 1979, among them Mannlicher–Schönauer adopted by the Greek Army in 1903. The M1941 Johnson rifle and M1947 Johnson auto carbine uses rotary magazines. The design is still used in some modern firearms, most notably the Ruger American series, the semi-automatic Ruger 10/22, the bolt-action Ruger 77/22 and the Steyr SSG 69.

==== Capsule ====
A capsule magazine functions similar to a box magazine, but the spring and follower is stowed away when the magazine bottom is flipped open. The cartridges are loosely dumped into the magazine and spring-fed to the chamber when the bottom is closed. On the Krag-Jørgensen the magazine is wrapped around the bolt-action to save vertical space and ease loading from the side.

The Krag-Jorgensen bolt-action rifle is the only firearm to use this type of magazine and it was adopted by the militaries of Denmark, Norway, and the United States in the late 19th century.

==== Chain/Linkless feed ====
Much like a rotary magazine, these use an internal continuous chain that works like a conveyor belt. The ARCO Abider, Marek MSG 3J, Ruger 10/22, Sosso 1941 pistol, Small Arms Ltd. Model 2, Moruzh-2 and the Heckler & Koch LMG 11 use these magazines.

=== Drum ===
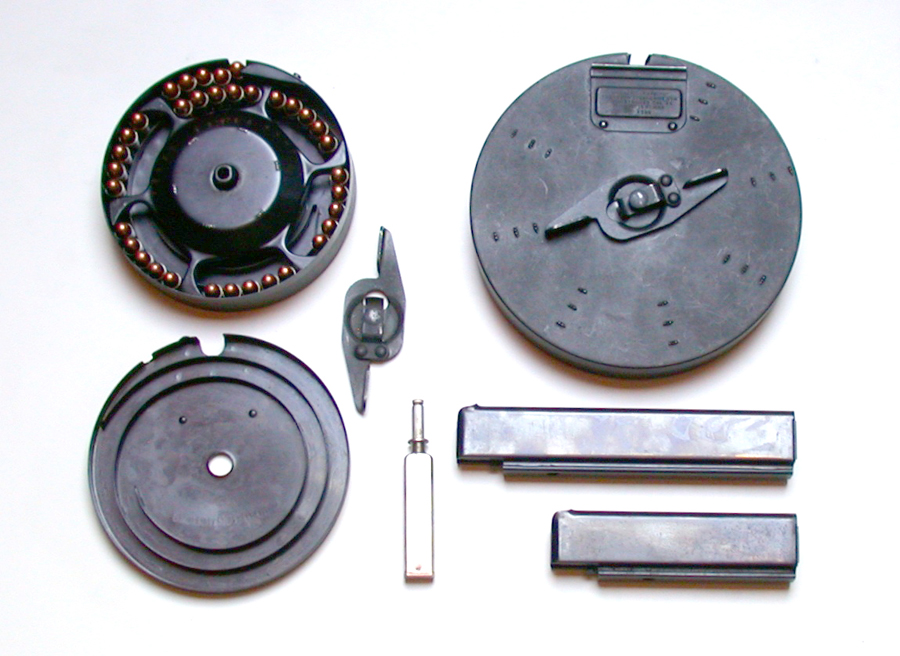
50- and 100-round drum magazines plus 20- and 30-round box magazines for Thompson SMG

Drum magazines are used primarily for light machine guns. In one type, a moving partition within a cylindrical chamber forces loose rounds into an exit slot, with the cartridges being stored parallel to the axis of rotation. After loading of the magazine, a wound spring or other mechanism forces the partition against the rounds. In all models a single column is pushed by a follower through a curved path. From there the rounds enter the vertical riser either from a single or dual drums. Cylindrical designs such as rotary and drum magazines allow for larger capacity than box magazines, without growing to excessive length. The downside of a drum magazine's extra capacity is its added weight that, combined with the gun, can affect handling and prolonged use. Drum magazines can be more difficult to incorporate into combat gear compared to more regular, rectangular box magazines.

Many drum-fed firearms can also load from conventional box magazines, such as the Soviet PPSh-41 submachine gun, RPK light machine gun, and the American Thompson submachine gun.

The term "drum" is sometimes applied to a belt box for a belt-fed machine gun, though this is just a case that houses a length of ammunition belt, not a drum magazine.

==== Saddle-drum ====
Beta C-Mag double-drum magazine

Before WWII the Germans developed 75-round saddle-drum magazines for use in their MG 13 and MG 15 machine guns. The MG 34 machine guns could also use saddle-drum magazine when fitted with a special feed cover. The 75 rounds of ammunition were evenly distributed in each side of the magazine with a central feed "tower" where the ammunition is fed to the bolt. The ammunition was fed by a spring force, with rounds alternating from each side of the double drum so that the gun would not become unbalanced.

=== Pan ===
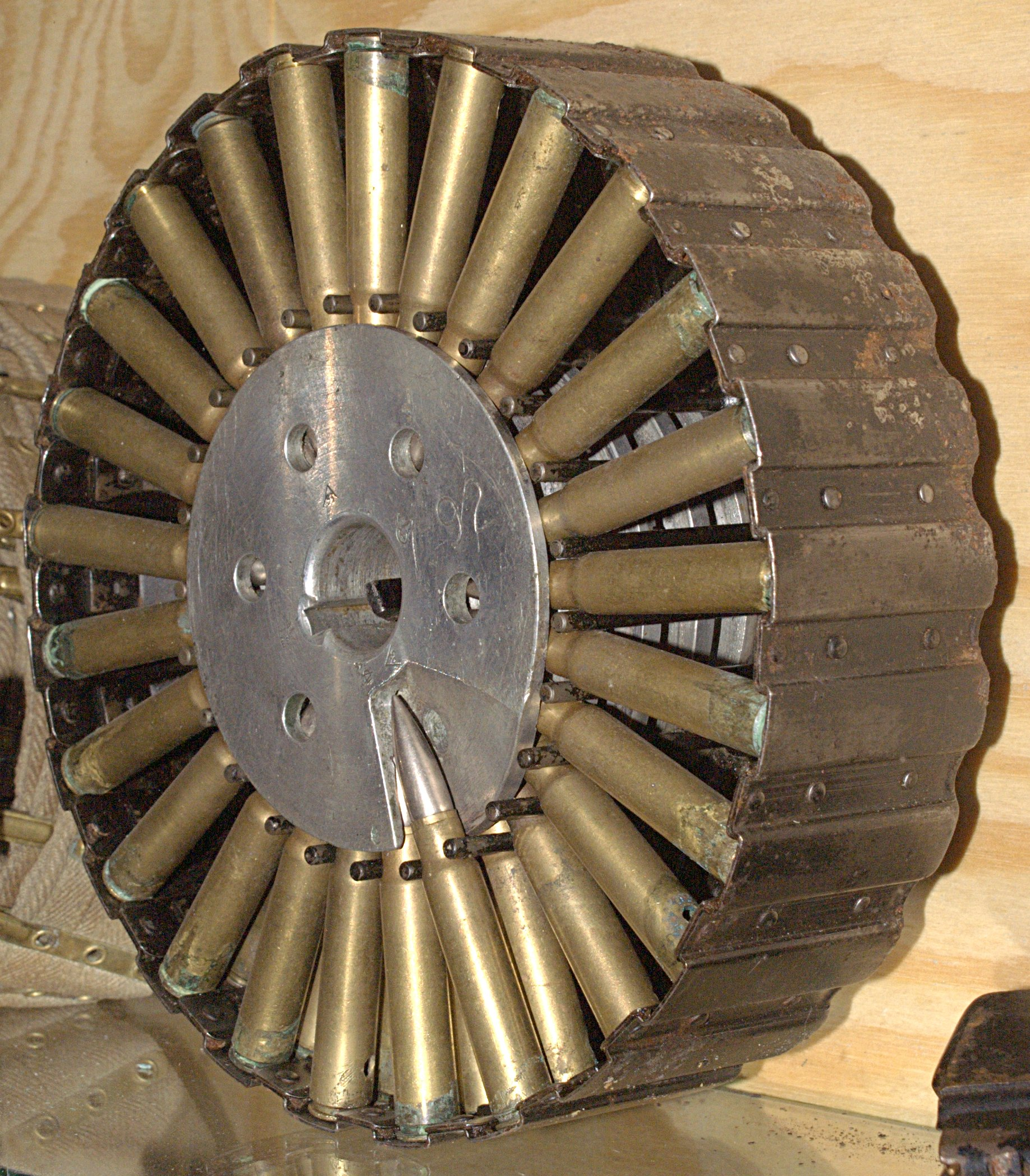
Pan magazine as used on a 7.92x57mm Lewis Gun.

Pan magazines differ from other circular magazines in that the cartridges are stored perpendicular to the axis of rotation, rather than parallel, and are usually mounted on top of the firearm. This type is used on the Lewis Gun, Vickers K, Bren Gun (only used in anti-aircraft mountings), Degtyaryov light machine gun, and American-180 submachine gun. The Type 89 machine gun was, highly unusually, fed from two 45-round quadrant-shaped pan magazines, each holding nine five-round stripper clips.

=== Helical ===
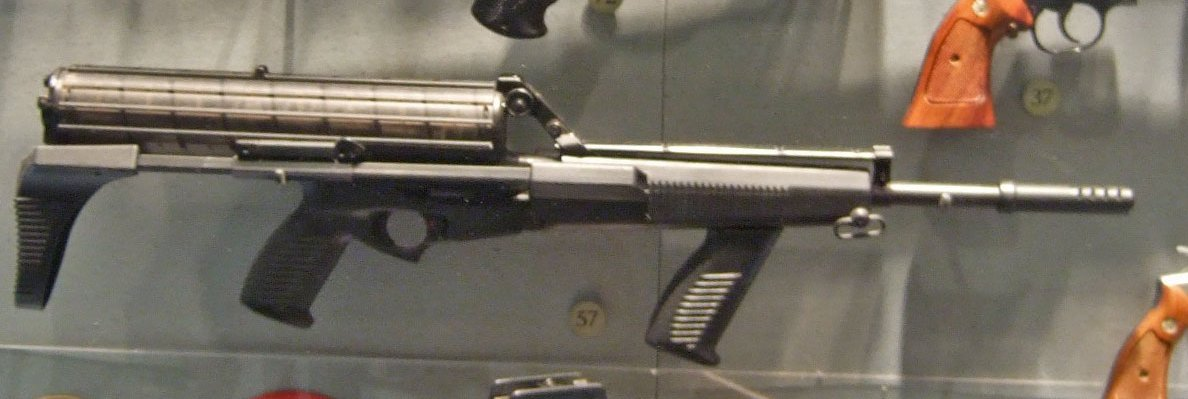
Calico pioneered the helical magazine design. Pictured is the company's M960 carbine.

Helical magazines extend the drum magazine design so that rounds follow a spiral path around an auger-shaped rotating follower or drive member, allowing for large ammunition capacity in a relatively compact package (compared to a regular box magazine of similar capacity). Early helical magazine designs include that patented by an unidentified inventor through the patent agent William Edward Newton in 1857 and the integral magazine of the Evans Repeating Rifle, patented in the late 1860s. This type of magazine is used by the Calico M960, PP-19 Bizon, CS/LS06 and KBP PP90M1. The North Korean military uses a 100- to 150-round helical magazine in the Type 88 assault rifle. Helical magazines carry substantially more ammunition but are inherently complex, which can make them difficult to load and less reliable in operation.

=== Hopper ===
The Japanese Type 11 light machine gun was the only weapon system that used a hopper magazine. This gun was fed by standard 6.5×50mmSR Arisaka stripper clips that were used by riflemen armed with the Type 38 bolt action rifle. The hopper was located on the left side of the receiver and held six of the 5-round clips, for a total of 30 rounds of ammunition. The hopper magazine was designed with a series of mechanical teeth activated by a cam track on the gas piston to pull cartridges off each clip and into the action. After the fifth and final round from each stripper clip was fed and fired, the empty clip would fall out the bottom of the hopper magazine and the next fully loaded stripper clip would then be dropped into place for feeding. There was a spring-loaded follower that applied pressure on top of the clips to hold them in place so they would not fall out while the weapon was being transported or fired.

== STANAG magazine ==
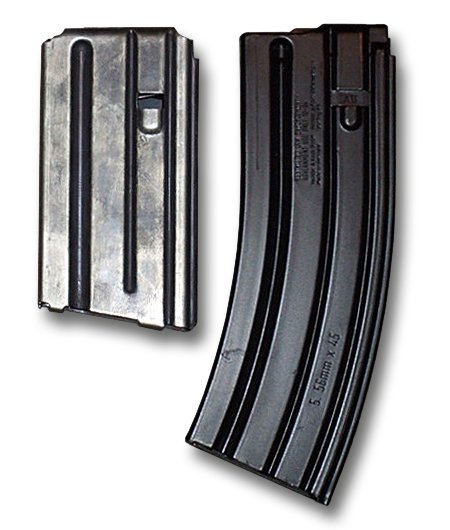
Two STANAG-compliant magazines: A 20-round Colt-manufactured magazine, and a 30-round Heckler & Koch "high reliability" magazine.

A STANAG magazine or NATO magazine is a type of detachable magazine proposed by NATO in October 1980. Shortly after NATO's acceptance of the 5.56×45mm NATO rifle cartridge, Draft Standardization Agreement (STANAG) 4179 was proposed in order to allow NATO members to easily share rifle ammunition and magazines down to the individual soldier level. The U.S. M16 rifle magazine was proposed for standardization. Many NATO members subsequently developed or purchased rifles with the ability to accept this type of magazine. However, the standard was never ratified and remains a "Draft STANAG".

The STANAG magazine concept is only an interface, dimensional, and control (magazine latch, bolt stop, etc.) requirement. Therefore, it not only allows one type of magazine to interface with various weapon systems, but also allows STANAG magazines to be made in various configurations and capacities. The standard STANAG magazines are 20, 30, and 40 round box magazines, but there are many other designs available with capacities ranging from one round to 60 and 100 round casket magazines, 90 round snail-drum magazines, and 100 round and 150 round double-drum magazines.

== Design ==
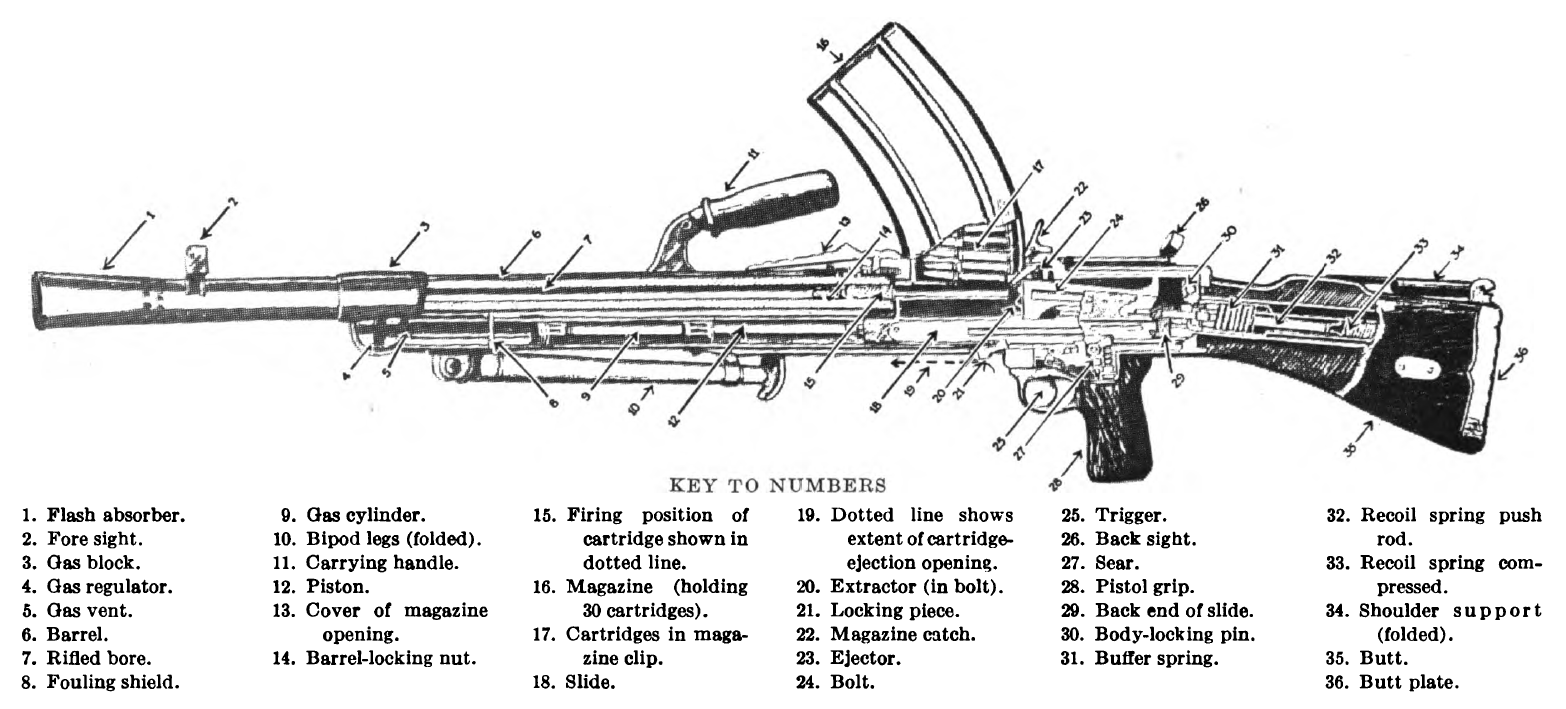
The Bren light machine gun had its magazine mounted on its top.

Magazines and belts land on complementing ends in their roles. A magazine carries a finite supply that can be replaced quickly, while a linked belt provides a larger supply, which reduces the need to reload. Because of this, belts favor firearms used in roles where sustained fire is needed. A belt-fed firearm requires a mechanism in the firearm to advance the belt, as compared to magazines, where the spring is built into the design. Therefore, when a belt does need to be replaced, it takes longer to position. If the feeding system jams, replacing the magazine is much faster than fixing the belt, a very desirable aspect when at close quarters. Due to the trade-offs, some dual-feed firearms have been developed, which support both magazines and belts.

While it is almost always desirable to increase the capacity of a magazine, reducing the time spent reloading, there is a limit to capacity, where attempting to pack more rounds in would produce a magazine that is too long, too unwieldy, or too unreliable. As an example, most modern LMGs use two-row box magazines, with a capacity of 30–45 rounds. While four-row box magazines have been devised with a capacity of up to 60 rounds, these were found to be too expensive and less reliable.

Magazine position on the firearm varies widely, appearing on the top, on the bottom, or on the side. A top-mounted magazine benefits from gravity and allows the gun itself to be mounted close to the ground. However, the magazine will project above the firearm, producing a more visible silhouette and obstructing the sight line. This requires the sights or magazine to be offset with the result, as in the Bren Gun, of being only able to be sighted from the right shoulder. A side-mounted magazine may reduce the time to reload from a standing position, but it also introduces a highly variable imbalance to the firearm as it empties, and can make carrying the firearm awkward. An underslung magazine leaves the space above the firearm clear, but its length is constrained by ground clearance when firing prone. In addition, low ground clearance may impede reloads, and the magazine must fight against gravity in order to feed. However, a factor in favor of underslung magazines is standardization. Many light machine guns derived from rifles maintain cross-compatibility with their rifle counterparts, sharing the same magazine. Shorter underslung magazines, as in sniper rifles, project less below the firearm and can mitigate the downsides of a prone firing position.

Drum and pan magazines increase capacity while keeping the length down. As such, they can be viewed as a mid-point between box magazines and belts. In some firearms, they can increase magazine capacity while still retaining the magazine mechanism, providing interchangeability with box magazines for role flexibility (such as in some LMGs, when used in an anti-aircraft capability). However, drum magazines are bulkier, more expensive, and harder to reload, making their adoption in infantry roles rare. For machine-guns, if more capacity is desired, the transition is usually to belt-feed mechanisms.

== High-capacity magazine ==
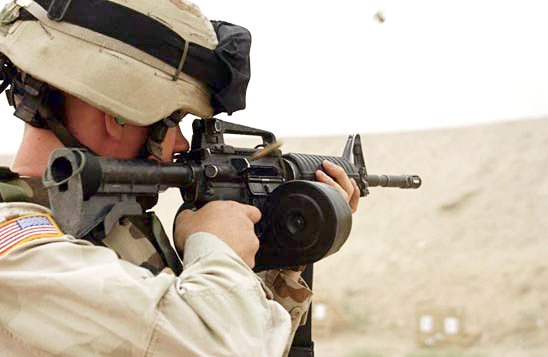
M4 with attached 100-round Beta C-Mag

A high-capacity magazine or large-capacity magazine or extended magazine is a magazine capable of holding more rounds of ammunition than the standard magazine for a particular firearm. The standard capacity for semi-automatic pistol magazines may range from 15 to 18 rounds; for AR-15s it is 20 to 30 rounds.

High-capacity magazines became popular in the 1950s and '60s with the burgeoning interest by police, militaries, and civilians in modern semi-automatic pistols. Some semi-automatic handguns, like popular Glock pistols, have available aftermarket high-capacity magazines.

High-capacity drum magazines have become more common in the civilian market in the United States, although they are far less common than standard, lower-capacity, typically 30 round, box magazines. They are valued by some shooters because they cut down on time spent reloading. As of 2019, about six manufacturers produced drum magazines in the United States, retailing for about $100 each. Manufacturers include KCI USA and Magpul Industries; the latter produces the same drum magazines for both civilian and military use.

High-capacity magazines are used by the military and law enforcement, competition shooters, hunters, and hobby shooters. They are used for home and personal defense. They are also used by mass shooters.

== High-capacity magazine bans ==
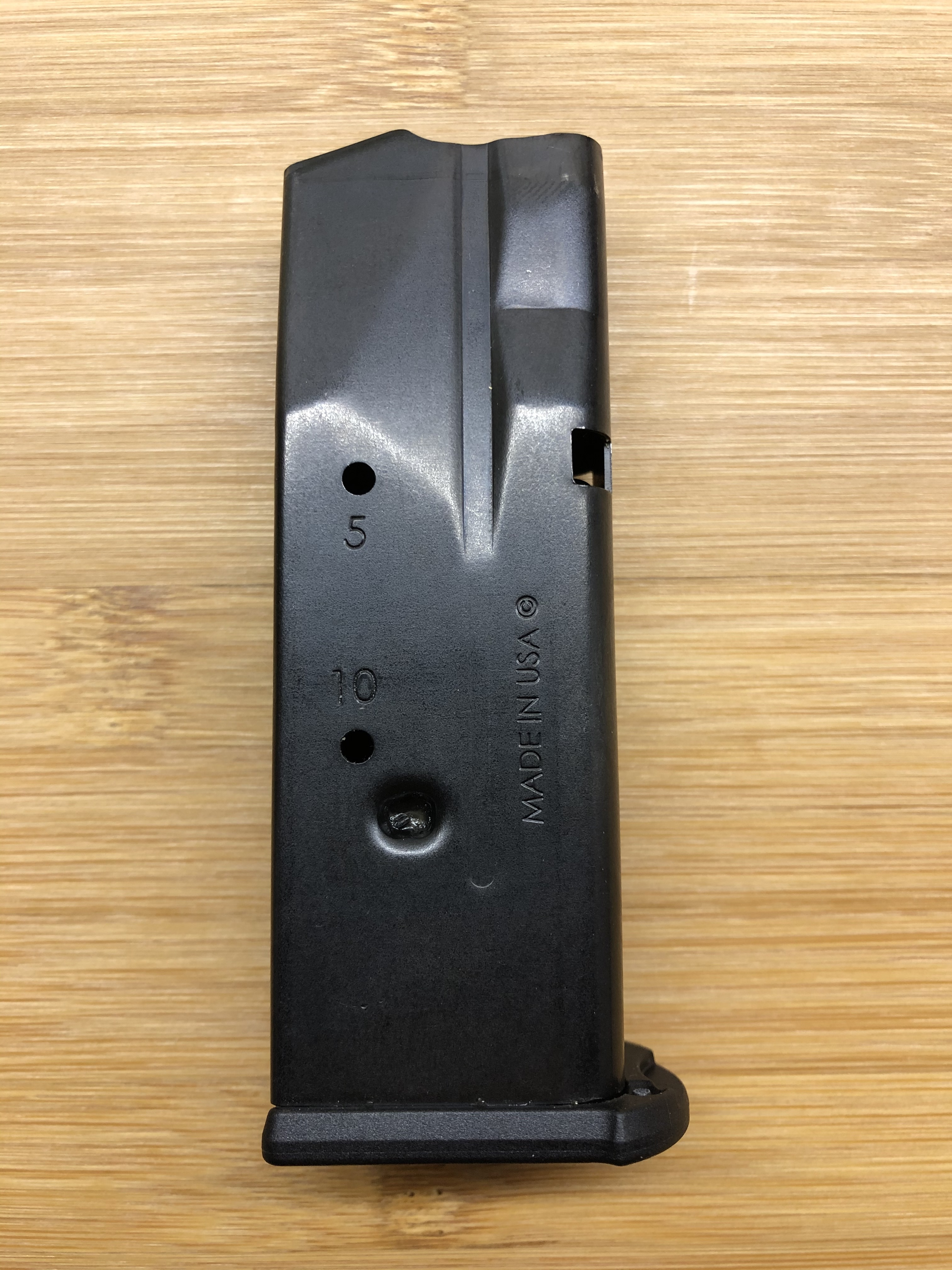
A magazine for a SIG Sauer P365 XL, modified by the manufacturer to limit capacity to 10 rounds, rather than its full 12 rounds.

A high-capacity magazine ban is a law which bans or otherwise restricts detachable magazines that can hold more than a certain number of rounds of ammunition. The term high-capacity magazine (or hi-capacity or large-capacity) refers to the number of rounds contained in a magazine, though there is no universal definition regarding what is considered high capacity. High-capacity is separately defined in laws. For example, in the United States, the now-expired Federal Assault Weapons Ban of 1994 included limits regarding magazines that could hold more than ten rounds. As of 2024, fourteen U.S. states, and a number of local governments, ban or regulate magazines that they have legally defined as high-capacity. The majority of U.S. states do not ban or regulate any magazines on the basis of capacity.

=== Australia ===
In Australia, handgun, semi-automatic rimfire, pump-action and lever-action rifle magazines (excluding tubular magazines like those found in gallery guns or Winchester rifles for manually repeating rifles) holding more than ten rounds, shotgun magazines holding more than 5 rounds, and bolt-action and straight-pull rifle magazines holding more than 15 rounds are heavily restricted (Category D).

=== Canada ===
In Canada, magazines designed for use in semi-automatic centrefire rifles and semi-automatic shotguns are limited to 5 rounds, and magazines designed for use in handguns are limited to 10 rounds. Magazines designed for use in semi-automatic rimfire rifles, as well as manually operated long guns, are exempt from the magazine capacity restrictions.

=== Russia ===
In Russia, all magazines for use with any type of firearm except sport handguns and award weapons are limited to no more than 10 rounds.

=== United Kingdom ===
There are no capacity restrictions on detachable magazines in the United Kingdom. However, since January 1989, any shotgun with a detachable magazine, or a non-detachable magazine capable of holding more than two cartridges is classed as a Section 1 firearm and must be held on a firearm certificate, which is subject to more stringent requirements than "normal" section 2 shotguns held on a shotgun certificate. Section 2 shotguns include break-barrel guns with no magazine, as well as repeating and semi-automatic guns with fixed two-round magazines. When the 1988 Act was introduced, many guns with larger (often tubular magazines) were brought into compliance by crimping the magazine.

=== United States ===
William B. Ruger, a founder of Sturm, Ruger & Co., is often ascribed with providing the impetus for high-capacity magazine restrictions. Ruger proposed that instead of banning firearms, Congress should outlaw magazines holding more than 15 rounds. "No honest man needs more than 10 rounds in any gun," Ruger told Tom Brokaw of NBC News in 1992. On March 30, 1989, Ruger sent a letter to every member of the US Congress stating:

"The best way to address the firepower concern is therefore not to try to outlaw or license many millions of older and perfectly legitimate firearms (which would be a licensing effort of staggering proportions) but to prohibit the possession of high capacity magazines. By a simple, complete and unequivocal ban on large capacity magazines, all the difficulty of defining 'assault rifle' and 'semi-automatic rifles' is eliminated. The large capacity magazine itself, separate or attached to the firearm, becomes the prohibited item. A single amendment to Federal firearms laws could effectively implement these objectives."

William B. Ruger

The National Rifle Association (NRA) and the National Shooting Sports Foundation (NSSF) say defining magazines with capacities greater than nine rounds as high- or large-capacity is mislabeling. The NRA Institute for Legislative Action (NRA-ILA) claims that magazines that can hold more than 10 rounds are standard capacity and dispute the definition of "high capacity" in bans.

==== Federal law ====
Between 1994 and 2004, the Federal Assault Weapons Ban, which included a ban on high-capacity magazines, was in effect. It prohibited new magazines over 10 rounds in the United States. After the expiration of the ban, there is no nationwide prohibition against the possession of high-capacity magazines, which are considered an unregulated firearm accessory.

Legislation to restore a federal high-capacity magazine ban has been repeatedly introduced by Democrats in the United States Congress since the expiration of the Federal Assault Weapons Ban, especially in the wake of mass shootings in the United States in which high-capacity magazines were used, including the Tucson shooting (2011), the Aurora, Colorado movie theater shooting (2012), and the Harvest music festival shooting (2017). These efforts have been thus far unsuccessful. The federal Keep Americans Safe Act, which would restore the ban on new magazines that hold more than 10 rounds, passed the House Judiciary Committee in September 2019.

==== State laws ====
A number of U.S. states as well as Washington, D.C. have high-capacity magazine restrictions or bans. The types of acts prohibited vary among the jurisdictions; most prohibit manufacture, sale, or possession, but some states' laws are narrower (Maryland law does not ban possession of high-capacity magazines) while other states' laws are broader (some states also ban the transfer, transportation, or acquisition of high-capacity magazines). Some states' laws include "grandfather" provisions for pre-ban high-capacity magazines, exempting these, while other states' laws do not.

From 2024 to 2026, federal appeals courts issued conflicting rulings on assault weapons laws and their associated magazine capacity restrictions. The courts upheld assault weapons bans and high-capacity magazine bans for Maryland, Massachusetts, Connecticut, and Illinois. But in July 2026, a federal appellate court struck down New Jersey's law, ruling that it violates the Second Amendment. New Jersey's law is still in effect while the state appeals to the Supreme Court.

In June 2026 the U.S. Supreme Court agreed to consider the constitutionality of restrictions on assault weapons and high-capacity magazines in Connecticut and in Cook County, Illinois.

State-level magazine capacity restrictions include the following:

- California – more than 10 rounds – illegal to transfer or import; a ban on possession is on hold pending an appeal to the U.S. Supreme Court
- Colorado – more than 15 rounds, with some exceptions for magazines possessed before July 1, 2013
- Connecticut – more than 10 rounds, with some exceptions for magazines possessed before January 1, 2014
- Delaware – more than 17 rounds; concealed-carry permit holders exempt
- District of Columbia – more than 10 rounds
- Hawaii – more than 10 rounds – handguns only
- Illinois – more than 10 rounds for rifles or shotguns, more than 15 rounds for handguns – illegal to transfer or import, legal to possess on private property
- Maryland – more than 10 rounds – illegal to transfer, legal to possess or import
- Massachusetts – more than 10 rounds, with some exceptions for magazines possessed before September 13, 1994
- New Jersey – more than 10 rounds
- New York – more than 10 rounds
- Oregon – more than 10 rounds – effective January 1, 2028
- Rhode Island – more than 10 rounds
- Vermont – more than 10 rounds for rifles or shotguns, more than 15 rounds for handguns, with some exceptions for magazines possessed before April 11, 2018
- Virginia – more than 15 rounds – illegal to transfer or import, legal to possess – on hold pending legal appeals
- Washington – more than 10 rounds – illegal to transfer or import, legal to possess

==== Municipal and county laws ====
U.S. cities and counties with high-capacity magazine restrictions or bans include:

- Denver, Colorado
- Cook County, Illinois
- Aurora, Illinois
- Chicago, Illinois
- Oak Park, Illinois
- Albany, New York
- Buffalo, New York
- New York, New York
- Rochester, New York

==== Legal status ====
The constitutionality of high-capacity magazine bans has been repeatedly upheld by United States courts of appeal courts, including the courts of appeals for the First Circuit, Second Circuit, Third Circuit, Fourth Circuit, Seventh Circuit, Ninth Circuit, and D.C. Circuit. The Supreme Court of the United States has issued grant, vacate, and remand orders for the active cases in the Third, Fourth, and Ninth Circuits to be reconsidered in light of New York State Rifle & Pistol Association, Inc. v. Bruen.

The D.C. Court of Appeals in its Benson v. United States decision struck down magazine bans on constitutional grounds in March 2026.

=== Impact ===
==== On gun homicide rates and lethality ====
A 2004 study examined the impact of the Federal Assault Weapons Ban (1994 through 2004), which included a prohibition on sales of magazines with capacities over ten rounds. The authors wrote that the ban was not associated with a reduction in firearm homicides or the lethality of gun crimes in general. They suggested this may have been due to the concurrent rise in the use of large capacity magazines with non-banned semiautomatic weapons. The authors noted that high-capacity magazines have a greater potential for affecting gun crime due to the fact that they are also used in firearms not classified as assault weapons. They added, "However, it is not clear how often the ability to fire more than 10 shots without reloading (the current magazine capacity limit) affects the outcomes of gun attacks." Overall the authors reported that there had been "no discernible reduction in the lethality and injuriousness of gun violence, based on indicators like the percentage of gun crimes resulting in death or the share of gunfire incidents resulting in injury, as we might have expected had the ban reduced crimes with both AWs and LCMs."

A 2019 Rockefeller Institute of Government study found no statistically significant association between state-level LCM bans and homicide rates.

A 2020 RAND Corporation review of seven studies on the impact of LCM bans on violent crime rates found "inconclusive evidence for the effect of high-capacity magazine bans on total [homicides] and firearm homicides."

==== On mass shooting rates and lethality ====
A 2019 study examined the effect of large-capacity magazine (LCM) bans on the frequency and lethality of "high-lethality mass shootings" (defined as those resulting in six or more fatalities) in the United States from 1990 to 2017. Of the 69 high-fatality mass shootings in the U.S. over that period, at least 44 (64%) involved LCMs. Attacks involving LCMs "resulted in a 62% higher mean average death toll" than mass shootings in which high-capacity magazines were not used. States which had banned high-capacity magazines had a substantially lower incidence of mass shootings, as well as far fewer fatalities in mass shootings: "The incidence of high-fatality mass shootings in non–LCM ban states was more than double the rate in LCM ban states; the annual number of deaths was more than 3 times higher." The study acknowledged that because 69 incidents over a 28-year period was, for statistical purposes, "a relatively small number and limits the power to detect significant associations," it was possible that the magnitude of the effects detected was overestimated. The study authors "did not have the statistical power (and thus did not even try) to determine whether different aspects of the various LCM laws might have differential effects on the incidence of high-fatality mass shootings."

A 2020 study, examining fatal mass shootings in the U.S. for the period 1984–2017, found that, when controlling for other variables, LCM bans, and handgun purchaser licensing laws, were associated with a significant reduction in fatal mass shootings, while assault weapon bans, background checks, and de-regulation of civilian concealed carry were not.

== See also ==
- Bottom metal
- List of 3D-printed weapons and parts
