= Tang sight =

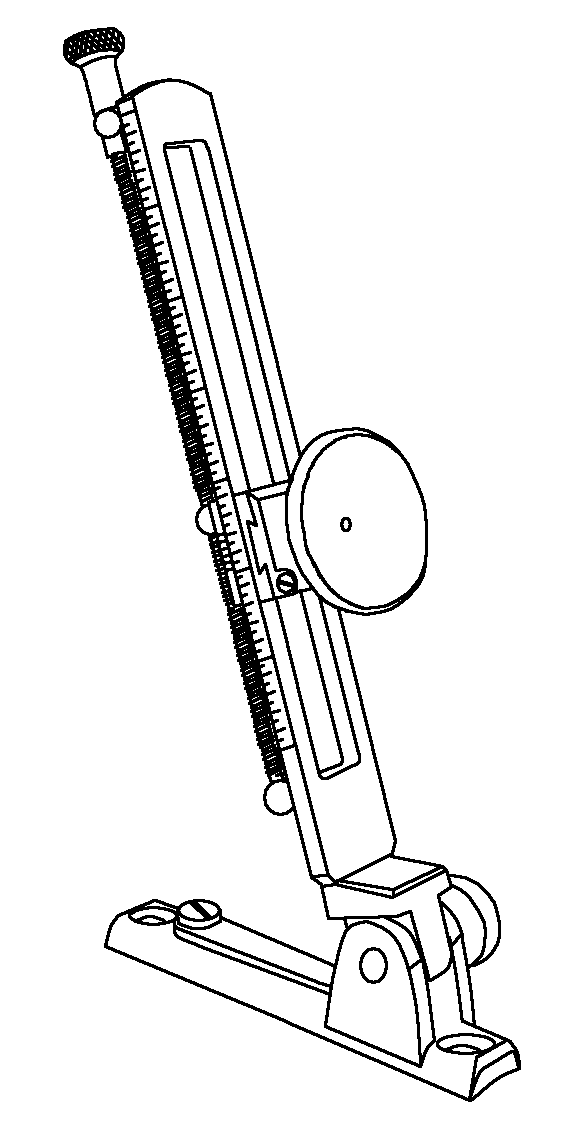
A tang sight with adjustable elevation, designed to fold down to minimize damage during transport

A tang sight is the rear sight of a pair of iron sights used to aim or align a rifle so the bullet fired will hit the target. The sight is attached to the tang: a steel plate extending toward the butt from a rifle receiver for attachment of the receiver to a wooden buttstock. A tang sight often offers the maximum sight radius, or distance between the front and rear sights attached to the rigid receiver and barrel assembly of a rifle. Large sight radius decreases bullet placement errors caused by sight misalignment.

Tang sights were widely used for long-range shooting during the late 19th century. They became less common as lighter rifles with heavier recoil increased the possibility of eye injury from the proximity of the sight to the shooter's face. Tang sights remain popular with individuals participating in historical re-enactment events and cowboy action shooting matches.
