= Iron sights =

Aiming device

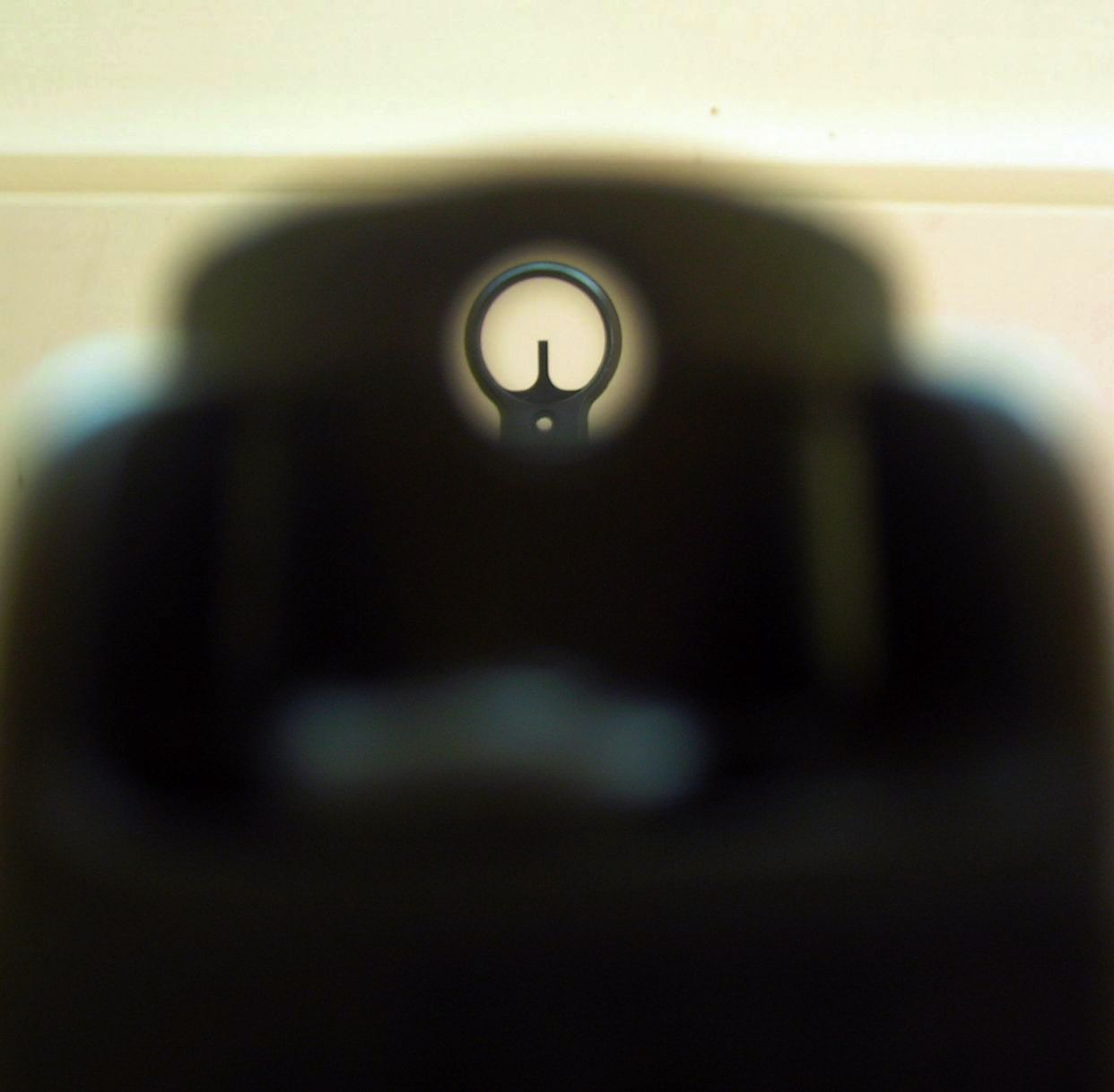
Sight picture through iron sights of an H&K MP5 submachine gun. The annular shroud around the front post sight is aligned with the rear peep sight to ensure the firearm is properly trained.

Iron sights are a system of physical alignment markers used as a sighting device to assist the accurate aiming of ranged weapons such as firearms, airguns, crossbows, and bows, or less commonly as a primitive finder sight for optical telescopes. Iron sights, which are typically made of metal, are the earliest and simplest type of sighting device. Since iron sights neither magnify nor illuminate the target, they rely completely on the viewer's naked eye and the available light by which the target is visible. In this respect, iron sights are distinctly different from optical sight designs that employ optical manipulation or active illumination, such as telescopic sights, reflector (reflex) sights, holographic sights, and laser sights.

Iron sights are typically composed of two components mounted perpendicularly above the weapon's bore axis: a 'rear sight' nearer (or 'proximal') to the shooter's eye, and a 'front sight' farther forward (or 'distal') near the muzzle. During aiming, the shooter aligns their line of sight past a gap at the center of the rear sight and towards the top edge of the front sight. When the shooter's line of sight, the iron sights, and target are all aligned, a 'line of aim' that points straight at the target has been created.

Front sights vary in design but are often a small post, bead, ramp, or ring. There are two main types of rear iron sight: 'open sights', which use an unenclosed notch, and 'aperture sights', which use a circular hole. Nearly all handguns, as well as most civilian, hunting, and police long guns, feature open sights. By contrast, many military service rifles employ aperture sights.

The earliest and simplest iron sights were fixed and could not be easily adjusted. Many modern iron sights are designed to be adjustable for sighting in firearms by adjusting the sights for elevation or windage. On many firearms it is the rear sight that is adjustable.

For precision shooting applications such as varminting or sniping, the iron sights are usually replaced by a telescopic sight. Iron sights may still be fitted alongside other sighting devices (or in the case of some models of optics, incorporated integrally) for back-up usage, if the primary sights are damaged or lost.

== Principles ==
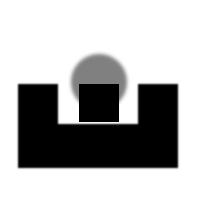
A center hold sight picture with focus on the front sight; the out-of-focus gray dot represents the target.

A 6 o'clock sight picture with focus on the front sight; the out-of-focus gray dot represents the target.

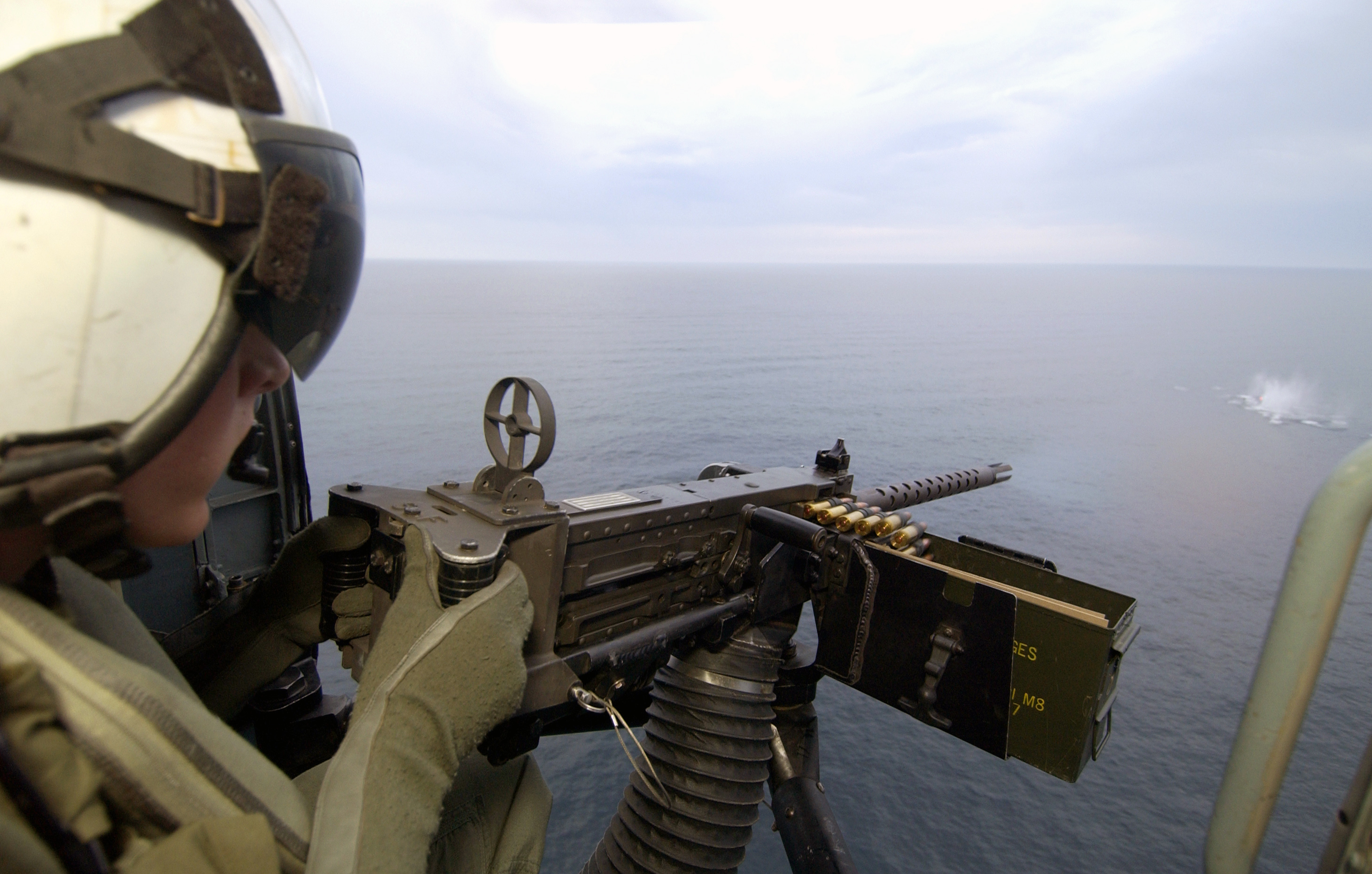
Aerial gunnery iron ring sight on a GAU-21 that allows for compensating for the roll-pitch-yaw of an aircraft.

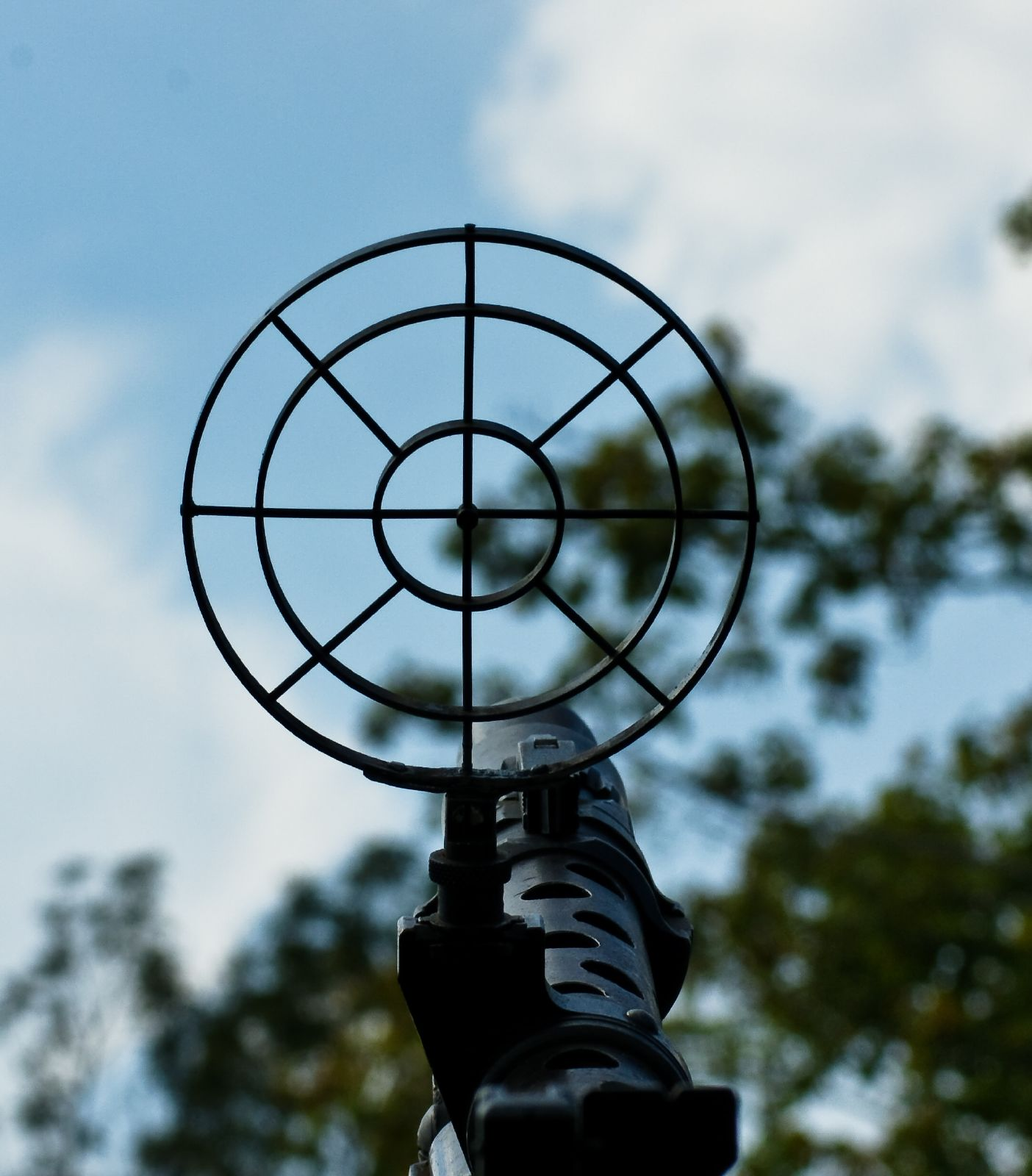
Spiderweb-type (low level) anti-aircraft sight on an MG 34.

In the case of firearms, where the projectile follows a curved ballistic trajectory below the bore axis, the only way to ensure it will hit an intended target is by aiming at the precise point on the trajectory at that target's intended distance. To do that, the shooter aligns their line of sight with the front and rear sights, forming a consistent 'line of aim' (known as the 'sight axis') and in turn producing what is known as the 'point of aim' (POA) within their own field of view, which then gets pointed directly (i.e. aimed) at the target. The physical distance between the front and rear sights is known as the 'sight radius', the longer of which produces smaller angular errors when aiming.

"Sighting in" is a process in which the sight axis is adjusted to intersect the trajectory of the bullet at a designated distance (typically at 100 yards/meters), in order to produce a pre-determined point of impact (POI) at that distance, known as a "zero". Using that "zero" as a default reference, the point of aim can be readily re-calibrated to superimpose with the bullet's point of impact when shooting at different distances. Modern iron sights can all provide some horizontal and vertical adjustments for sighting-in, and often have elevation markings that allow the shooter to quickly compensate (though with rather limited precision) for increasing bullet drops at extended distances. Because the sight axis (which is a straight line) and the projectile trajectory (which is a parabolic curve) must be within the same vertical plane to have any chance of intersecting, it will be very difficult to shoot accurately if the sights are not perpendicularly above the gun barrel (a situation known as canting) when aiming or sighting-in.

=== Long gun sights ===
Rear sights on long guns (such as rifles and carbines) are usually mounted on a dovetail slot on the back part of the barrel or the receiver, closer to the eye of the shooter, allowing for easy visual pick-up of the notch. Front sights are mounted to the front end of the barrel by dovetailing, soldering, screwing, or staking very close to the muzzle, frequently on a "ramp". Some front sight assemblies include a detachable hood intended to reduce glare, and if the hood is circular, then this provides a reference where the eye will naturally align one within the other.

=== Handgun sights ===
In the case of handguns, the rear sight will be mounted on the frame (for revolvers, derringers, and single-shots) or on the slide (for semi-automatic pistols). Exceptions are possible depending on the type of handgun, e.g. the rear sight on a snub-nose revolver is typically a trench milled into the top strap of the frame, and the front sight is the to-be-expected blade. Certain handguns may have the rear sight mounted on a hoop-like bracket that straddles the slide.

With typical blade- or post-type iron sights, the shooter would center the front sight's post in the notch of the rear sight and the tops of both sights should be level. Since the eye is only capable of focusing on one focal plane at a time, and the rear sight, front sight and target are all in separate planes, only one of those three planes can be in focus. Which plane is in focus depends on the type of sight, and one of the challenges to a shooter is to keep the focus on the correct plane to allow for best sight alignment. The general advice, however, is to focus on the front sight.

=== Shotgun sights ===
Sights for shotguns used for shooting small, moving targets (such as skeet shooting, trap shooting, and clay pigeon shooting) work quite differently. The rear sight is completely discarded, and the rear reference point is provided by the correct and consistent positioning of the shooter's head. A brightly colored (generally made of polished brass or silver, or a plastic fluorescent green or orange material) round bead is placed at the end of the barrel. Often, this bead will be placed along a raised, flat rib, which is usually ventilated to keep it cool and reduce mirage effects from a hot barrel. Rather than being aimed like a rifle or handgun, the shotgun is pointed with the focus always on the target, and the unfocused image of the barrel and bead are placed below the target (the amount below depends on whether the target is rising or falling) and slightly ahead of the target if there is lateral movement. This method of aiming is not as precise as that of a front sight/rear sight combination, but it is much faster, and the wide spread of shots can allow an effective hit even if there is some aiming error. Some shotguns also provide a mid-bead, which is a smaller bead located halfway down the rib, which allows more feedback on barrel alignment. Some shotguns may also come equipped with rifle-style sights. These types of sights are typically found on shotguns intended for turkey hunting.

=== Parallax and precision ===
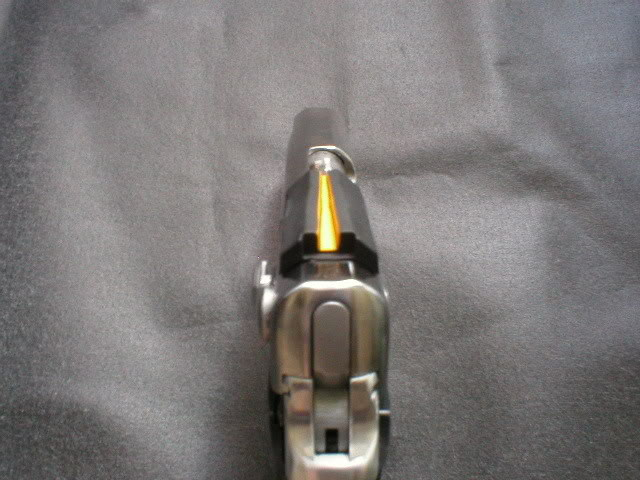
Guttersnipe sight on the ASP pistol

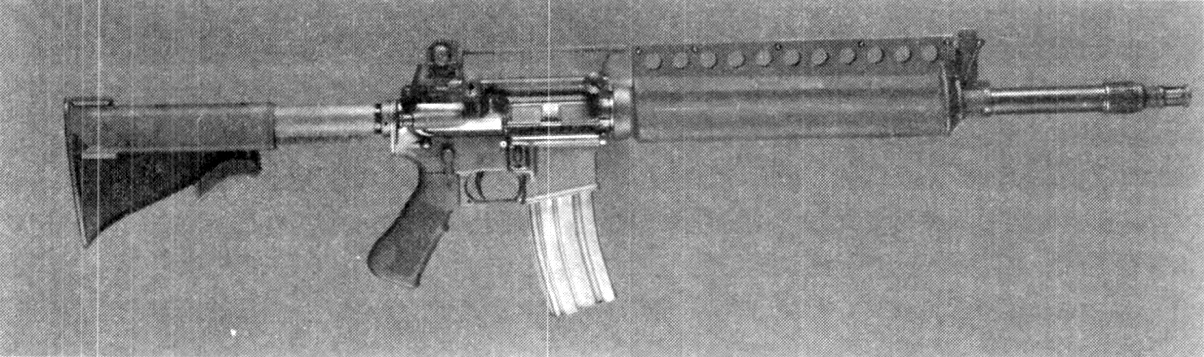
Trench sight on the Colt ACR to improve fast track target acquisition

Due to parallax, even a tiny error in the angle of sight alignment results in a trajectory that diverges from the target on a trajectory directly relative to the distance from the target, causing the bullet to miss the target; for example, a 10 meter air rifle shooter is trying to hit the 10 ring, which is merely a 0.5 mm (0.020 in) diameter dot on the target at 10 m (33 ft) and with a 4.5 mm (0.18 in) diameter pellet, an error of only 0.2 mm (0.0079 in) in sight alignment can mean a complete miss (a 3 mm (0.12 in) point of impact miss). At 1,000 m (3,300 ft), that same misalignment would be magnified 100 times, giving an error of over 300 mm (12 in), 1,500 times the sight misalignment. (Note: Calculations assume a 660 mm (26 in) sight radius or sighting line.) Increasing the sight radius helps to reduce eventual angular errors and will, in case the sight has an incremental adjustment mechanism, adjust in smaller increments when compared to a further identical shorter sighting line. With the front sight on the front end of the barrel, sight radius may be increased by moving the rear sight from the barrel onto the receiver or tang.

== Types ==
=== Open sights ===
A selection of open sights, and one aperture sight suitable for use with long eye relief: A) U-notch and post, B) Patridge, C) V-notch and post, D) Express, E) U-notch and bead, F) V-notch and bead, G) trapezoid, H) ghost ring. The gray dot represents the target

Open sights generally are used where the rear sight is at significant distance from the shooter's eye. They provide minimum occlusion of the shooter's view, but at the expense of precision. Open sights generally use either a square post or a bead on a post for a front sight. To use the sight, the post or bead is positioned both vertically and horizontally in the center of the rear sight notch. For a center hold, the front sight is positioned on the center of the target, bisecting the target vertically and horizontally. For a 6 o'clock hold, the front sight is positioned just below the target and centered horizontally. A 6 o'clock hold is only good for a known target size at a known distance and will not hold zero without user adjustment if these factors are varied. From the shooter's point of view, there should be a noticeable space between each side of the front sight and the edges of the notch; the spaces are called light bars, and the brightness of the light bars provides the shooter feedback as to the alignment of the post in the notch. Vertical alignment is done by lining up the top of the front post with the top of the rear sight, or by placing the bead just above the bottom of the V or U-notch. If the post is not centered in the V or U notch, the shot will not be accurate. If the post extends over the V or U-notch it will result in a high shot. If the post does not reach the top of the V or U-notch it will result in a low shot.

Patridge sights, named after inventor E. E. Patridge, a 19th-century American sportsman, consist of a square or rectangular post and a flat-bottomed square notch and are the most common form of open sights, being preferred for target shooting, as the majority of shooters find the vertical alignment is more precise than other open sights. V-notch and U-notch sights are a variant of the patridge which substitute a V- or U-shaped rear notch. Other common open sight types include the buckhorn, semi-buckhorn, and express.

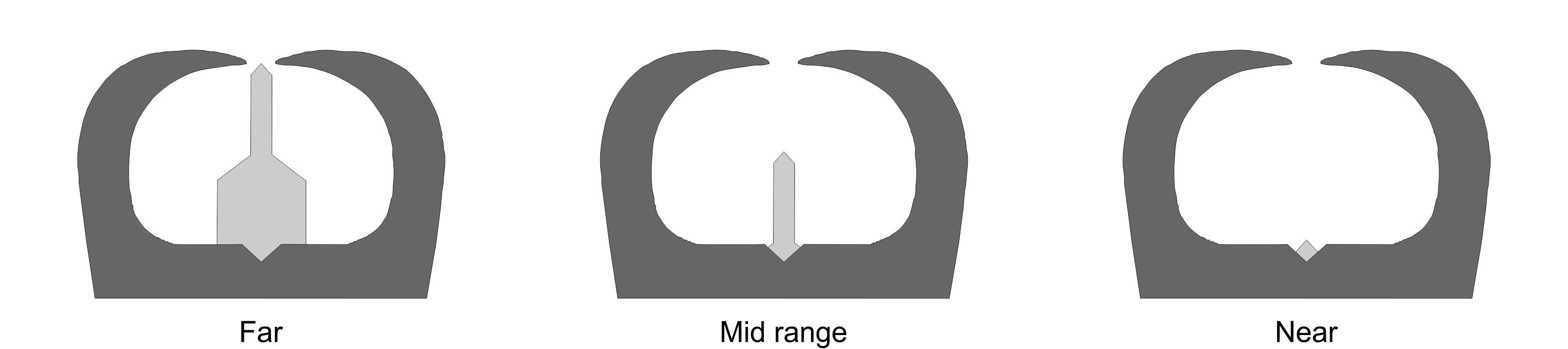
Buckhorn sight picture at three ranges

Buckhorn sights have extensions protruding from either side of the rear sight forming a large ring which almost meets directly above the "V" of the notch. The semi-buckhorn is similar but has a wider gently curving notch with the more precise "V" at its center and is standard on classic Winchester and Marlin lever-action rifles. They allow the 'Kentucky windage' (Note: 'Kentucky windage' is a technique for adjusting range or windage by 'aiming off' from the regular datum of the sight, rather than adjusting the sight and aiming to the zero mark. Despite the name and its usual meaning, this is an application of the technique for range, not windage.) technique to provide rapid sighting for two or three ranges, without stopping for adjustment. When the fore sight is aligned with the horns of the rear sight, the rifle is sighted for long range. When aligned with the base of the horns, the range is near. It can also give an intermediate range picture.

Express sights are most often used on heavy caliber rifles intended for the hunting of dangerous big game, and are in the form of a wide and large "V" with a heavy white contrast line marking its bottom and a big white or gold bead front sight. These sights do not occlude the target as much as some other styles which is useful in the case of a charging animal. In cases where the range is close and speed far outweighs accuracy (e.g. the shooter is being charged by dangerous big-game), the front sight is used like a shotgun bead; the rear sight is ignored, and the bead is placed on the target. When more time is available, the bead is placed in the "V" of the rear sight.

Open sights have many advantages: they are very common, inexpensive to produce, uncomplicated to use, sturdy, lightweight, resistant to severe environmental conditions, and they do not require batteries. On the other hand, they are not as precise as other forms of sights, and are difficult or impossible to adjust. Open sights also take much more time to use—the buckhorn type is the slowest, patridge, "U" and "V" type notch sights are only a bit quicker; only the express sight is relatively fast. In addition, open sights tend to block out the lower portion of the shooter's field of view by nature, and because of the depth of field limitations of the human eye, do not work as well for shooters with less than perfect vision.

==== Shotgun sights ====
Among those utilizing shotguns for hunting of upland game, directing a shotgun toward its target is considered a slightly different skill than aiming a rifle or pistol. Shotgunners are encouraged to "point" a shotgun versus the accurate aiming of a rifle. Some even espouse a mentality that eliminates the concept of "aim" altogether. Because much of shotgunning involves putting a scatter pattern in the path of moving targets, the sight functions mostly as a subconscious aid. The front sight of a shotgun is a small spherical "bead" attached to the muzzle, acts as a reference, while the "rear sight" is nothing more than a narrow longitudinal groove on the receiver and barrel rib. When shooting, aligning the rear groove with the front bead is not to be consciously considered, as it comprises only a rough reference allowing the shooter to use their natural point of aim to make the shot.

In the tactical environment, where targets aren't moving across the visual field as quickly, sights do have a role. For many, a fiberoptic front sight is the preferred sighting reference in conjunction with a rear leaf. In this instance, the shotgun is used more like a rifle, allowing intentionally aimed shots. Some even equip their shotguns with open or aperture sights akin to a rifle.

Many shotgun bead sights are designed for a "figure 8" configuration, where a proper sight picture uses a bead mounted at the midpoint of the barrel in conjunction with a front bead mounted toward the muzzle. Many shotgun manufacturers, such as Browning, calibrate these sighting systems to produce a shotgun pattern that is "dead-on" when the front bead is stacked just above the mid-bead, producing the figure-8 sight picture.

=== Aperture sights ===
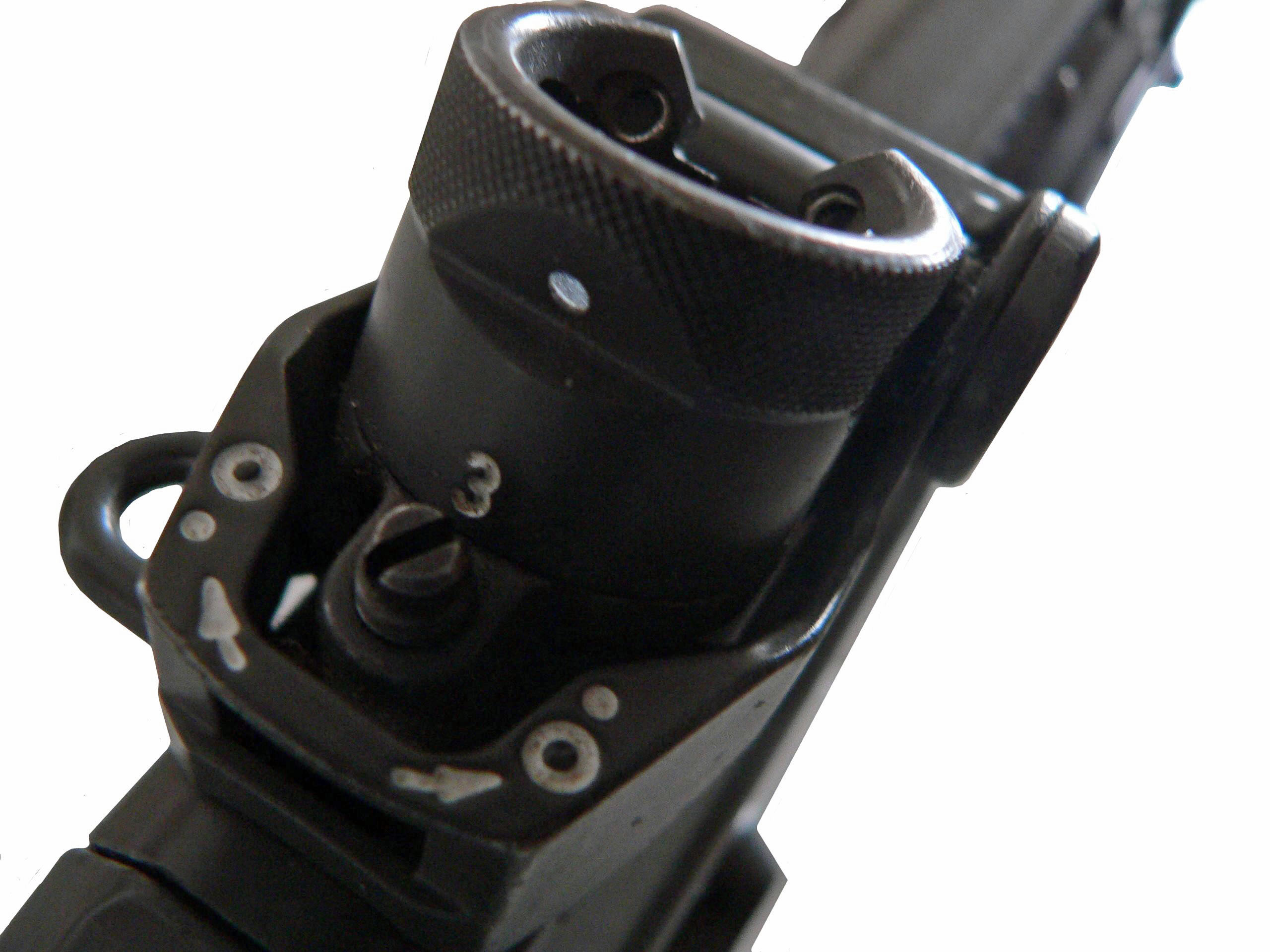
Rear, rotating diopter drum sight of a SIG SG 550 assault rifle. The viewing aperture above the "3" (denoting the 300 m setting) can be seen

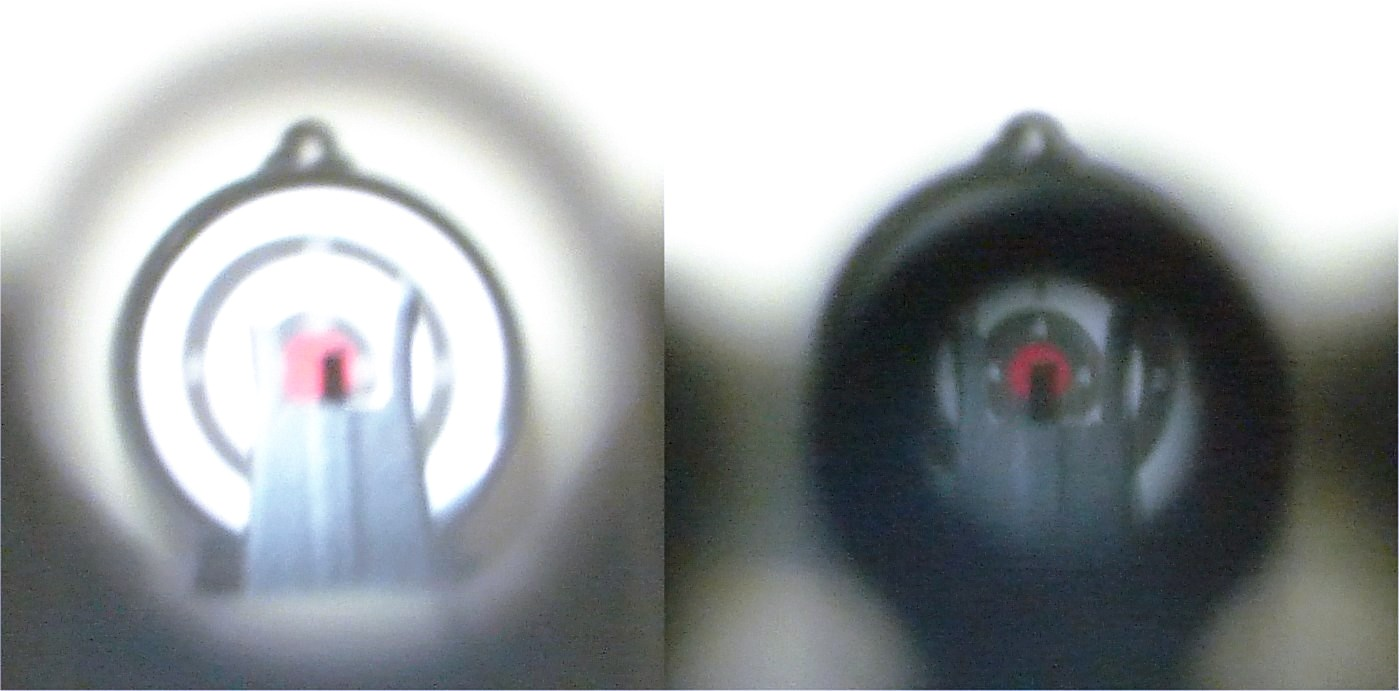
Pictures taken under identical conditions through large (left) and small (right) diameter aperture sights, with camera focused on front sight

Aperture sights, also known as "peep sights", range from the "ghost ring" sight, whose thin ring blurs to near invisibility (hence "ghost"), to target aperture sights that use large disks or other occluders with pinhole-sized apertures. In general, the thicker the ring, the more precise the sight, and the thinner the ring, the faster the sight.

The theory of operation behind the aperture sight is often stated that the human eye will automatically center the front sight when looking through the rear aperture, thus ensuring accuracy. However, aperture sights are accurate even if the front sight is not centered in the rear aperture due to a phenomenon called parallax suppression. This is because, when the aperture is smaller than the eye's pupil diameter, the aperture itself becomes the entrance pupil for the entire optical system of target, front sight post, rear aperture, and eye. As long as the aperture's diameter is completely contained within the eye's pupil diameter, the exact visual location of the front sight post within the rear aperture ring does not affect the accuracy, and accuracy only starts to degrade slightly due to parallax shift as the aperture's diameter begins to encroach on the outside of the eye's pupil diameter. An additional benefit to aperture sights is that smaller apertures provide greater depth of field, making the target less blurry when focusing on the front sight.

In low light conditions the parallax suppression phenomenon is markedly better. The depth of field looking through the sight remains the same as in bright conditions. This is in contrast to open sights, where the eye's pupil will become wider in low light conditions, meaning a larger aperture and a blurrier target. The downside to this is that the image through an aperture sight is darker than with an open sight.

These sights are used on target rifles of several disciplines and on several military rifles such as the Pattern 1914 Enfield and M1917 Enfield, M1 Garand, the No. 4 series Lee–Enfields, M14 rifle, Stgw 57, G3 and the M16 series of weapons along with several others. Rifle aperture sights for military combat or hunting arms are not designed for maximal attainable precision like target aperture sights, as these must be usable under suboptimal field conditions.

==== Ghost ring ====
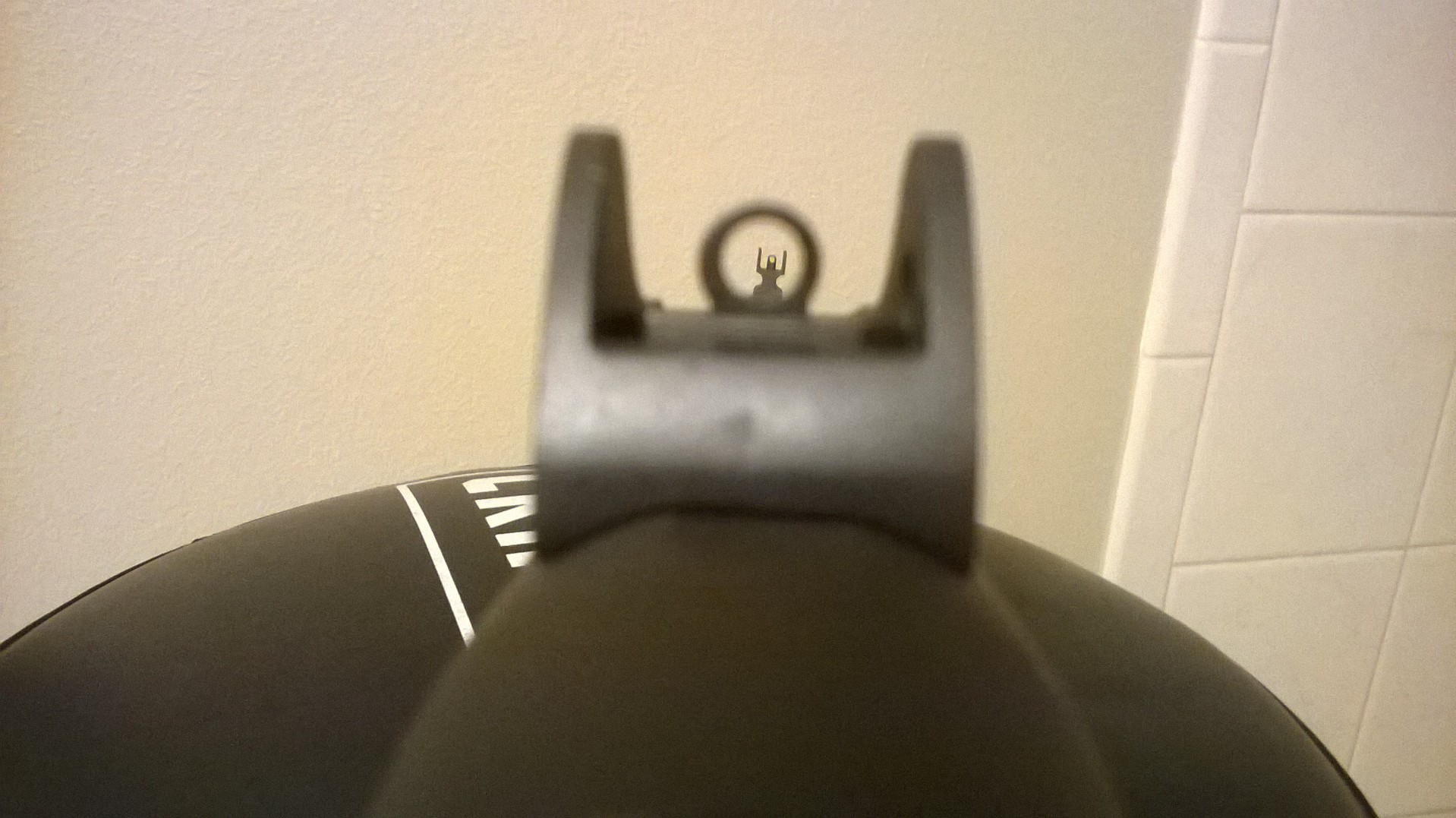
Example of ghost ring on Stevens Model 350 shotgun.

The ghost ring sight is considered by some to be the fastest type of aperture sight. It is fairly accurate, easy to use, and obscures the target less than nearly all other non-optical sights. Because of this, ghost ring sights are commonly installed on riot and combat shotguns and customized handguns, and they are also gaining ground as a backup sighting system on rifles. The ghost ring is a fairly recent innovation, and differs from traditional aperture sights in the extreme thinness of the rear ring and the slightly thicker front sight. The thin ring minimizes the occlusion of the target, while the thicker front post makes it easy to find quickly. Factory Mossberg ghost ring sights also have thick steel plates on either side of the extremely thin ring. These are to protect the sight's integrity if the shotgun were to fall and impact a surface in a way that could potentially damage or distort the shape of the ring.

==== Target aperture sights ====
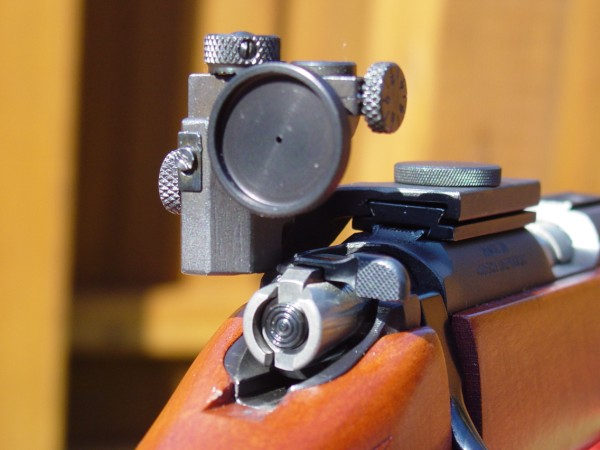
Rear aperture of a BRNO target sight. Note large disk and small aperture

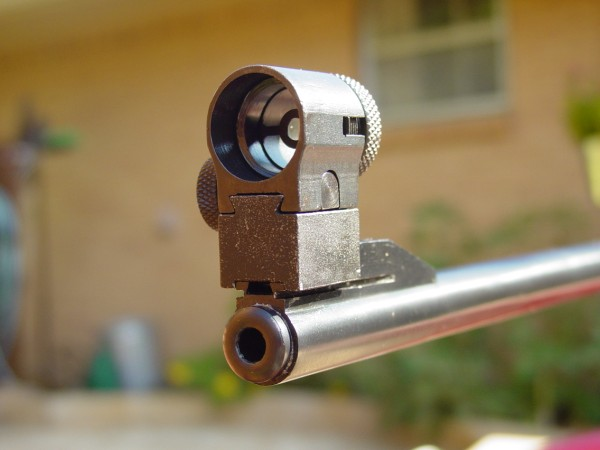
Front globe of a BRNO target sight. Note knurled nut holding in the replaceable front sight insert

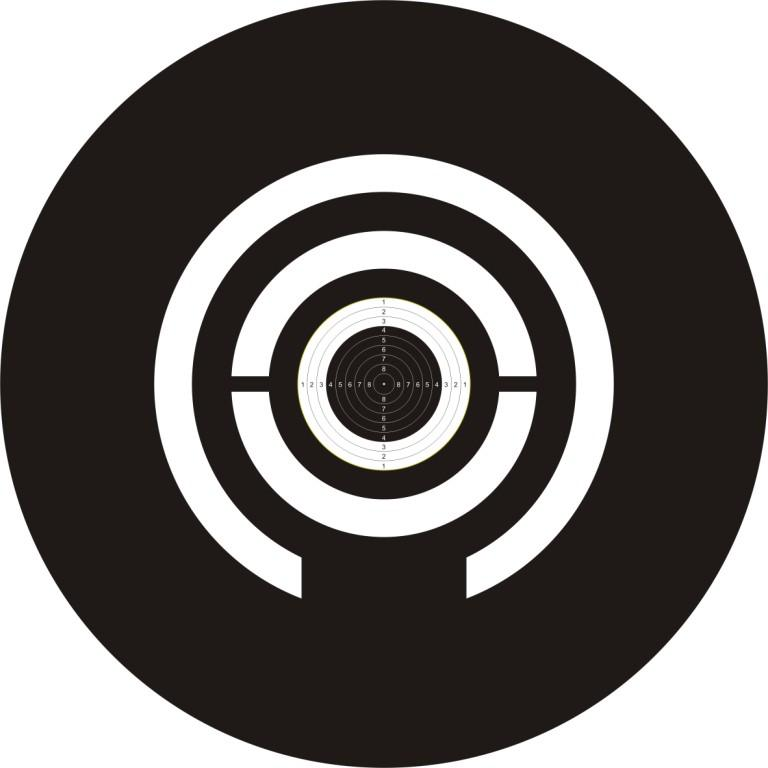
A 10 metre air rifle target diopter and globe aperture sight picture

Target aperture sights are designed for maximum precision. The rear sight element (often called "diopter") is usually a large disk (up to 1 inch or 2.5 cm in diameter) with a small hole in the middle, of approximately 1.2 mm (0.047 in) or less, and is placed close to the shooter's eye. High end target diopters normally accept accessories like adjustable diopter aperture and optical filter systems to ensure optimal sighting conditions for match shooters. Typical modern target shooting diopters offer windage and elevation corrections in 2 mm (0.079 in) to 4 mm (0.157 in) increments at 100 m (109.4 yd). Some International Shooting Sport Federation (ISSF) (Olympic) shooting events require this precision level for sighting lines, since the final score of the top competitors last shots series is expressed in tenths of scoring ring points.

The complementing front sight element may be a simple bead or post, but is more often a "globe"-type sight, which consists of a cylinder with a threaded cap, which allows differently shaped removable front sight elements to be used. Most common are posts of varying widths and heights or rings of varying diameter—these can be chosen by the shooter for the best fit to the target being used. Tinted transparent plastic insert elements may also be used, with a hole in the middle; these work the same way as an opaque ring, but provide a less obstructed view of the target. High end target front sight tunnels normally also accept accessories like adjustable aperture and optical systems to ensure optimal sighting conditions for match shooters. Some high end target sight line manufacturers also offer front sights with integrated aperture mechanisms.

The use of round rear and front sighting elements for aiming at round targets, like used in ISSF match shooting, takes advantage of the natural ability of the eye and brain to easily align concentric circles. Even for the maximum precision, there should still be a significant area of white visible around the bullseye and between the front and rear sight ring (if a front ring is being used). Since the best key to determining center is the amount of light passing through the apertures, a narrow, dim ring of light can actually be more difficult to work with than a larger, brighter ring. The precise sizes are quite subjective, and depend on both shooter preference and ambient lighting, which is why target rifles come with easily replaceable front sight inserts, and adjustable aperture mechanisms.

=== Front aperture size selection ===
Front aperture size is a compromise between a tight enough aperture to clearly define the aiming point and a loose enough aperture so as to not cause 'flicker'. When the aperture is too small, the boundary between the target and front aperture outline becomes indistinct, requiring the shooter to consciously or subconsciously generate small eye movements to measure the distance around the target. USA Shooting recommends a front aperture that creates at least 3 Minutes of Angle (MOA) of boundary space. In research performed by Precision Shooting, it was found that this increased shooter confidence, reduced hold times, and created more decisive shots. There may be an upper bound to the front aperture size that improves performance, however. In 2013, researchers performed experiments with the game of golf, specifically the skill of putting which is another skill that combines visual alignment with motor skills. They found that by manipulating the perceived size of the target (the golf hole) by surrounding it with concentric rings of various sizes, there was a phenomenon that improved performance when the target was surrounded by smaller circles thereby increasing its perceived size. They found that when the target was perceived as larger, performance increased.

==== Non-target aperture sights ====
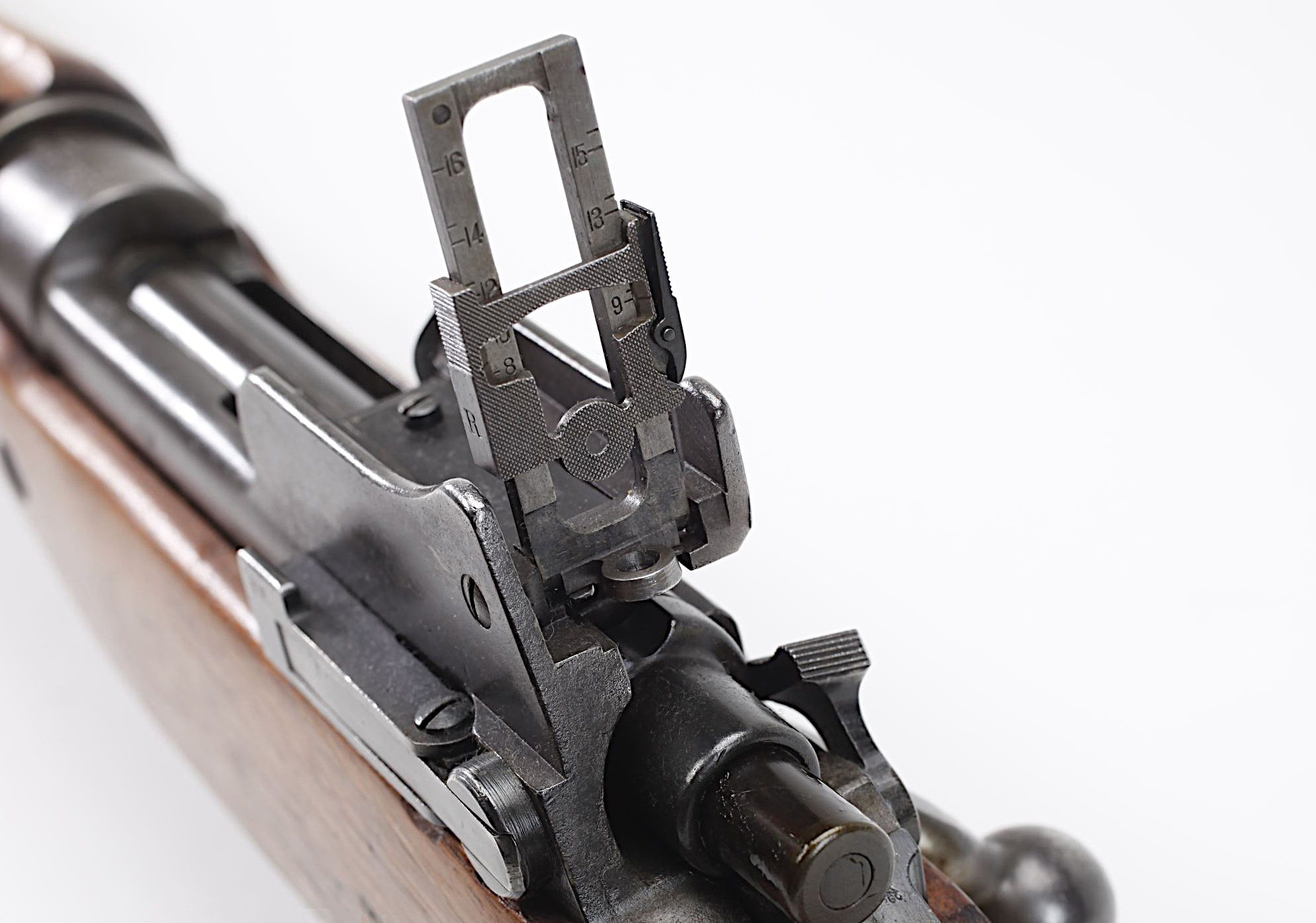
Military M1917 ladder aperture sight calibrated out to 1,600 yd (1,463 m)

Aperture sights on military rifles use a larger aperture with a thinner ring, and generally a simple post front sight.

Rifles from the late 19th century often featured one of two types of aperture sight called a "tang sight" or a "ladder sight". Since the black powder used in muzzleloaders and early cartridges was not capable of propelling a bullet at high speed, these sights had very large ranges of vertical adjustments, often on the order of several degrees, allowing very long shots to be made accurately. The .45-70 cartridge, for example, was tested by the military for accuracy at ranges of up to 1,500 yards (1,372 metres), which required 3 1/3 degrees of elevation. Both ladder and tang sights folded down when not in use to reduce the chance of damage to the sights. Ladder sights were mounted on the barrel, and could be used as sights in both the folded and unfolded states. Tang sights were mounted behind the action of the rifle, and provided a very long sight radius, and had to be unfolded for use, though rifles with tang sights often had open sights as well for close range use. Tang sights often had vernier scales, allowing adjustment down to a single minute of arc over the full range of the sight.

=== Flip up sights ===
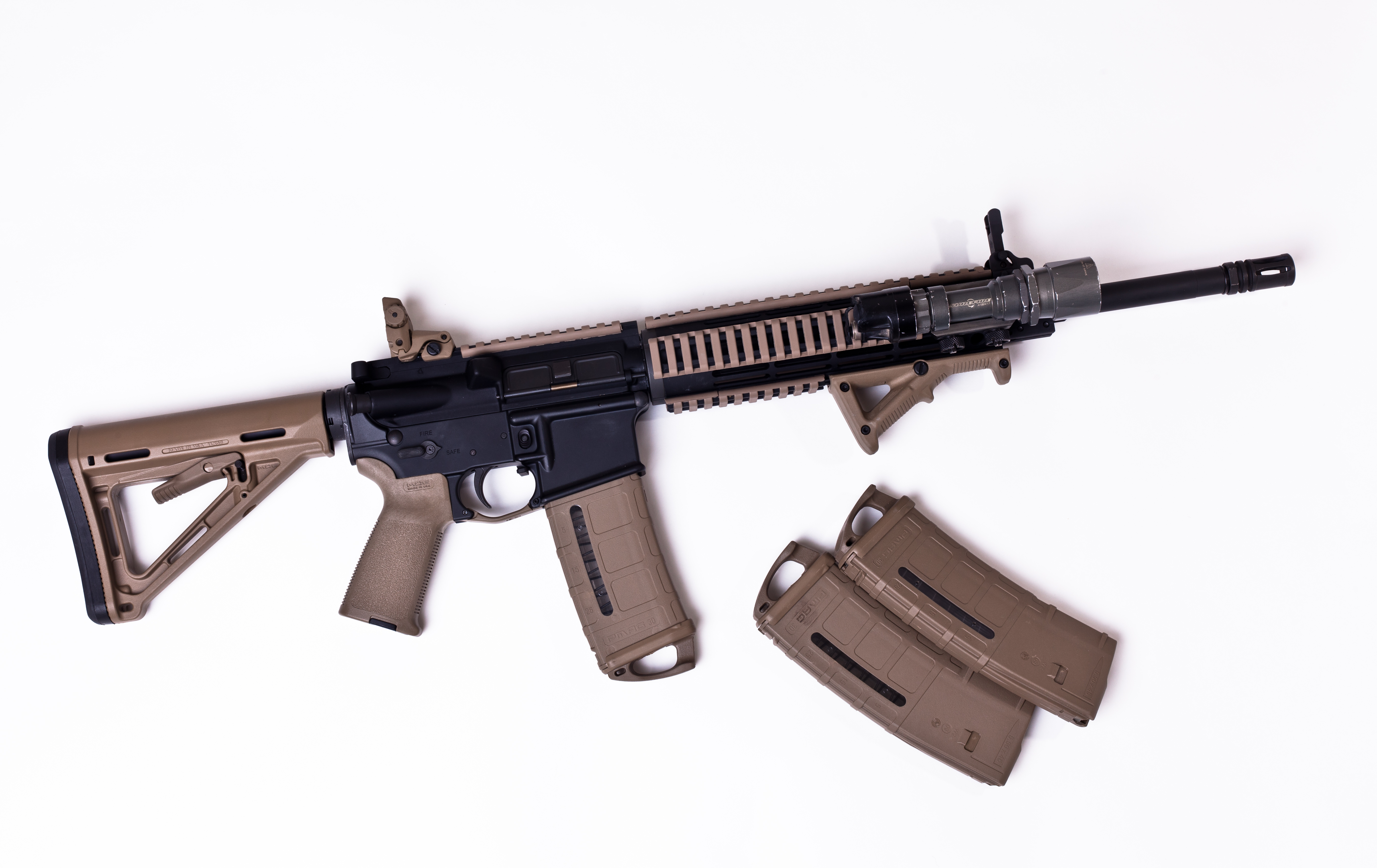
Rail mounted raised flip up rear and front sight elements on an AR-15 type rifle

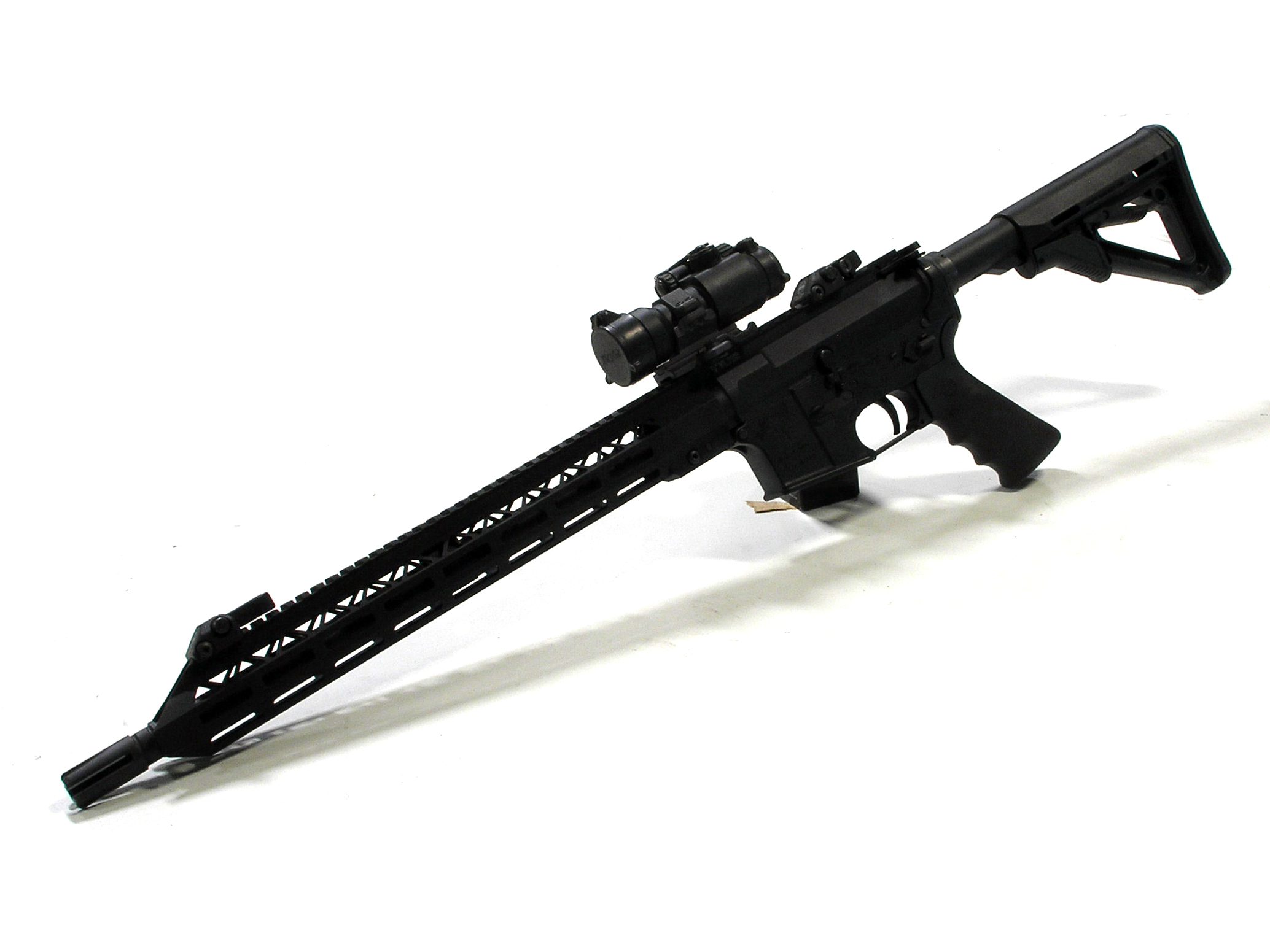
Rail mounted lowered flip up rear and front sight elements on an AR-15 type rifle

Assault rifles and sporterized semi-automatic rifles can have foldable rear and front sight elements that can be readily flipped up or down by the user. Such iron sights are often used as secondary sighting systems in case the main weapon sight (typically an optical sight such as a telescopic sight or red dot sight) malfunctions or becomes unsuitable for the tactical situation at hand, and are therefore referred to as backup iron sights (BUIS). Backup sights are usually mounted via Rail Integration Systems (most often Picatinny rails) in tandem with optical aiming devices, although "offset" BUISs that are mounted obliquely from the bore axis also exist. When used with non-magnifying optics (e.g. reflex or holographic sights), the flip-up rear and front elements often are designed to appear in the same sight picture, known as cowitnessing, as the primary optical sights.

== Adjustment ==
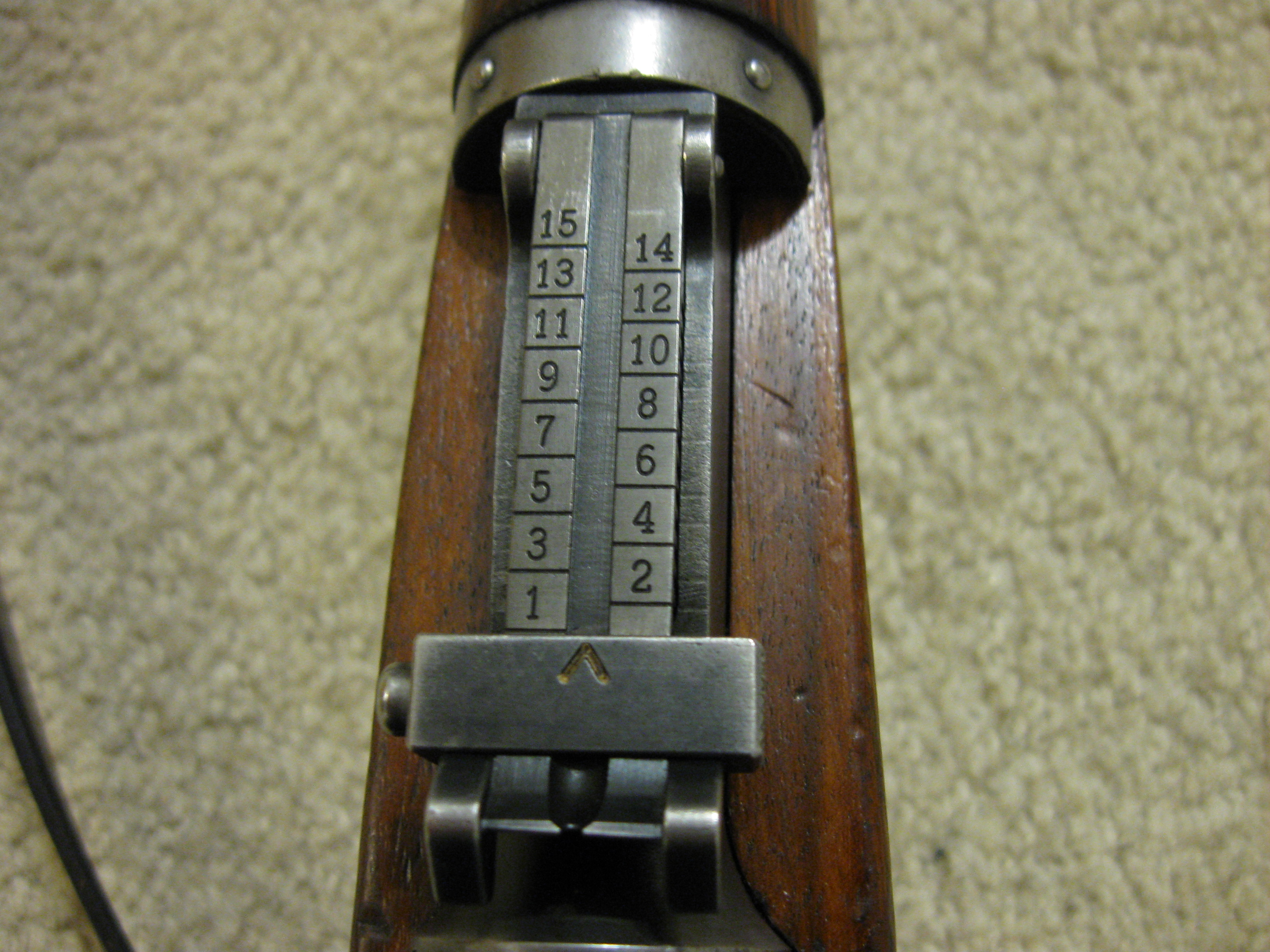
Tangent rear sight.

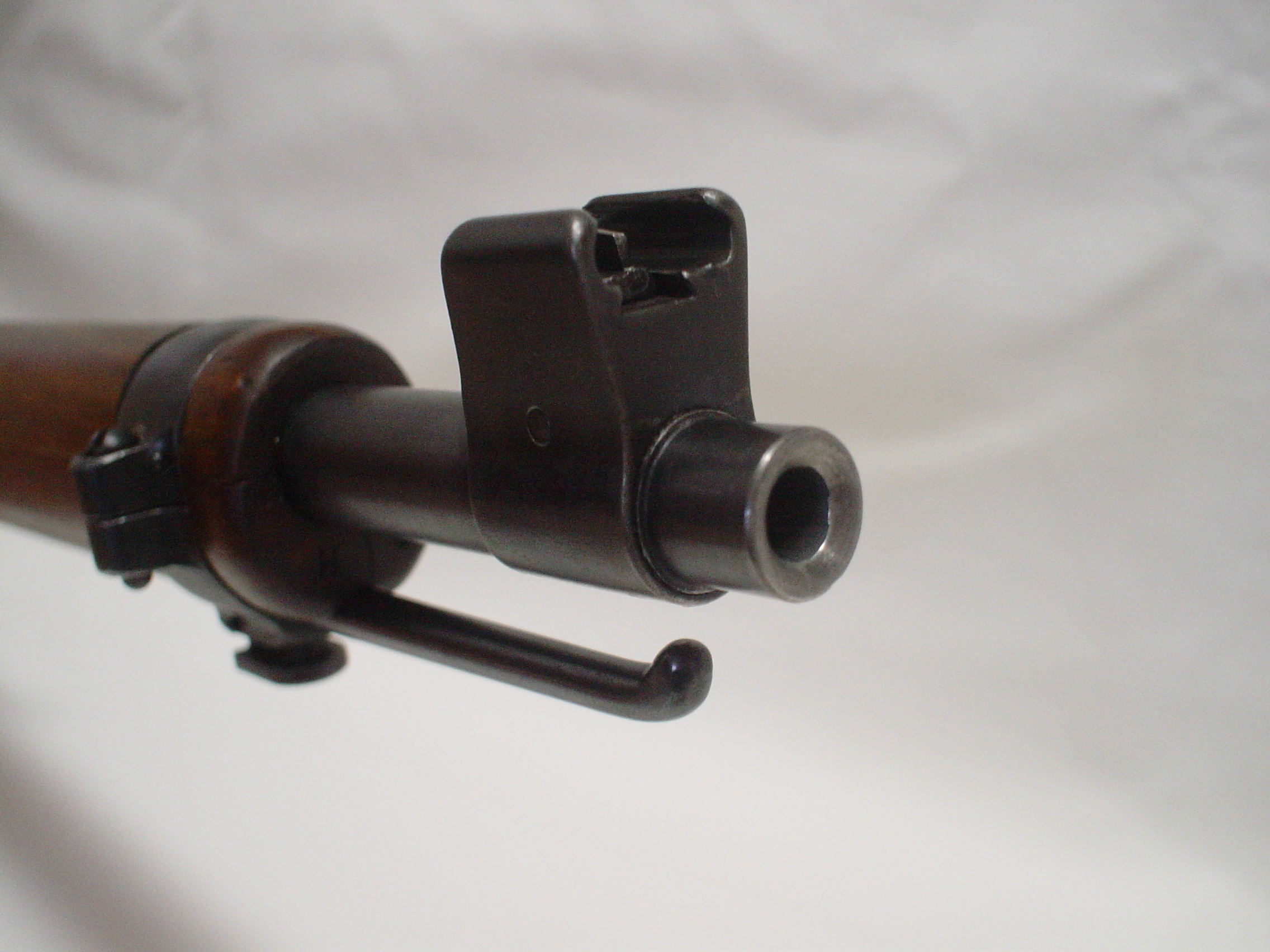
Front sight post.

Open sights arrangement on a K31 rifle, with calibrated markings for ranges out to 1,500 meters

Fixed sights are sights that are not adjustable. For instance, on many revolvers, the rear sight consists of a fixed sight that is a groove milled into the top of the gun's receiver. Adjustable sights are designed to be adjustable for different ranges, for the effect of wind, or to compensate for varying cartridge bullet weights or propellant loadings, which alter the round's velocity and external ballistics and thus its trajectory and point of impact. Sight adjustments are orthogonal, so the windage can be adjusted without impacting the elevation, and vice versa. If the firearm is held canted instead of level when fired, the adjustments are no longer orthogonal, so it is essential to keep the firearm level for best accuracy.

The downside to adjustable sights is the inherent fragility of the moving parts. A fixed sight is a solid piece of metal, usually steel, and if firmly attached to the gun, little is going to be able to damage it beyond usefulness. Adjustable sights, on the other hand, are bulkier, and have parts that must move relative to the gun. Solid impact on an adjustable sight will usually knock it out of adjustment, if not knock it right off the gun. Because of this, guns for self defense or military use either have fixed sights, or sights with "wings" on the sides for protection (such as those on the M4 carbine).

Iron sights used for hunting guns tend to be a compromise. They will be adjustable, but only with tools—generally either a small screwdriver or an Allen wrench. They will be compact and heavily built, and designed to lock securely into position. Target sights, on the other hand, are much bulkier and easier to adjust. They generally have large knobs to control horizontal and vertical movement without tools, and often they are designed to be quickly and easily detachable from the gun so they can be stored separately in their own protective case.

The most common is a rear sight that adjusts in both directions, though military rifles often have a tangent sight in the rear, which a slider on the rear sight has pre-calibrated elevation adjustments for different ranges. With tangent sights, the rear sight is often used to adjust the elevation, and the front the windage. The M16A2 later M16 series rifles have a dial adjustable range calibrated rear sight, and use an elevation adjustable front sight to "zero" the rifle at a given range. The rear sight is used for windage adjustment and to change the zero range.

== Enhancements ==
While iron sights are very simple, that simplicity also leads to a staggering variety of different implementations. In addition to the purely geometric considerations of the front blade and rear notch, there are some factors that need to be considered when choosing a set of iron sights for a particular purpose.

=== Glare reduction ===
Glare, particularly from the front sight, can be a significant problem with iron sights. The glare from the front sight can increase the apparent brightness of the light bar on one side of the sight, causing windage errors in aiming, or lower the apparent height of the front sight, causing elevation errors in aiming. Since the direction of the ambient light is rarely constant for a shooter, the resulting changing glare can significantly affect the point of aim.

The most common solution to the problem of glare is a matte finish on the sights. Serrating or bead blasting the sight is a common solution for brightly finished sights, such as blued steel or stainless steel. Jewelling can be a solution to glaring. Matte finishes such as parkerizing or matte black paint can also help. "Smoking" a sight by holding a match or cigarette lighter under the sight to deposit a fine layer of soot is a technique used by many shooters, and special soot-producing lighters are sold for use by competition shooters. Even a thin layer of mud or dirt applied to the sight will help kill the glare, as long as the coating is thin and consistent enough not to change the shape of the sights.

Many target sights are designed with vertical or even undercut front sight blades, which reduces the angles at which light will produce glare off the sight—the downside of these sights is that they tend to snag on clothing, branches, and other materials, so they are common only on target guns. Sight hoods reduce the chances of snagging an undercut sight and are common on some types of rifles, particularly lever-action rifles, but they are prohibited in some shooting disciplines.

=== Contrast enhancements ===
Various methods of open sight contrast enhancement. Left to right: Three dot, white outline, straight-eight, red insert, dot and bar, gold bead

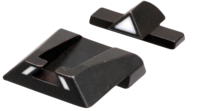
Steyr triangular pistol sights

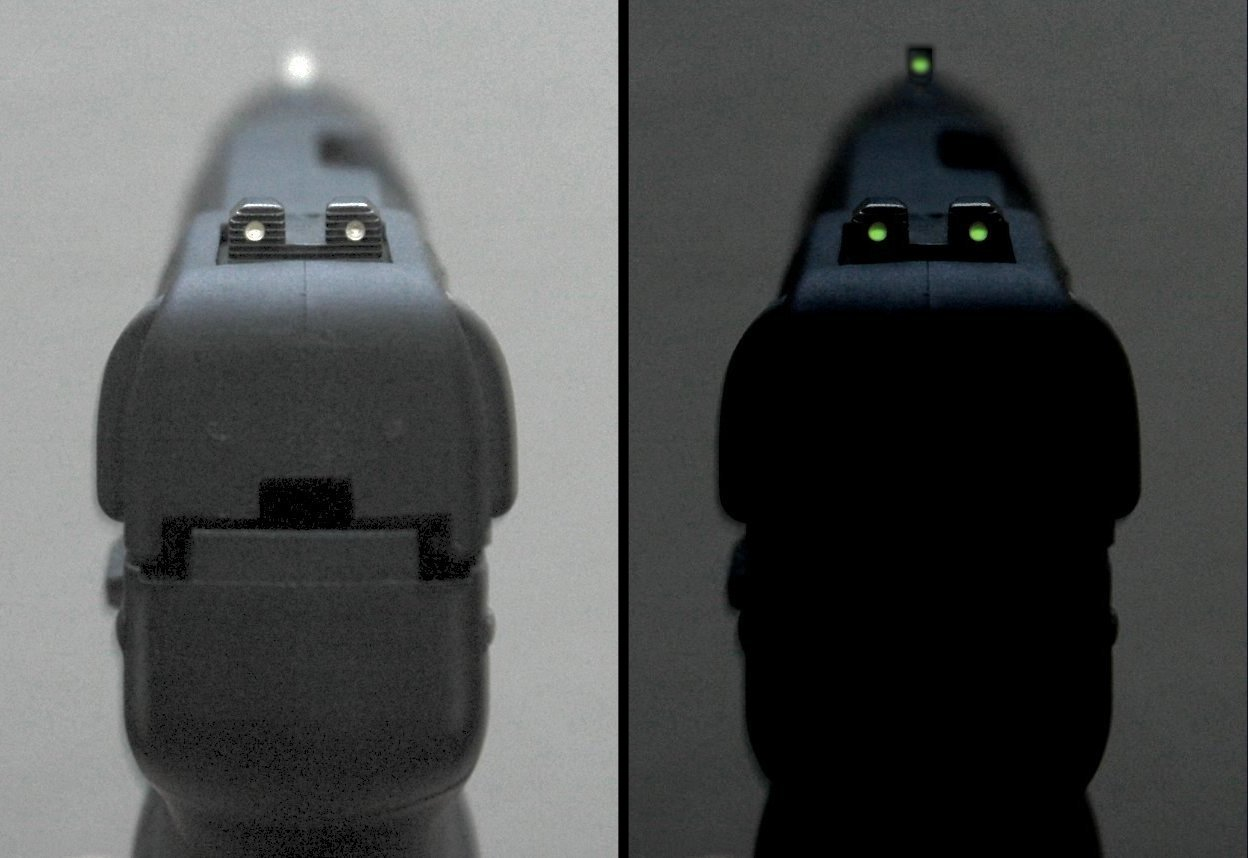
Tritium-illuminated handgun night sights on a FN Five-seven

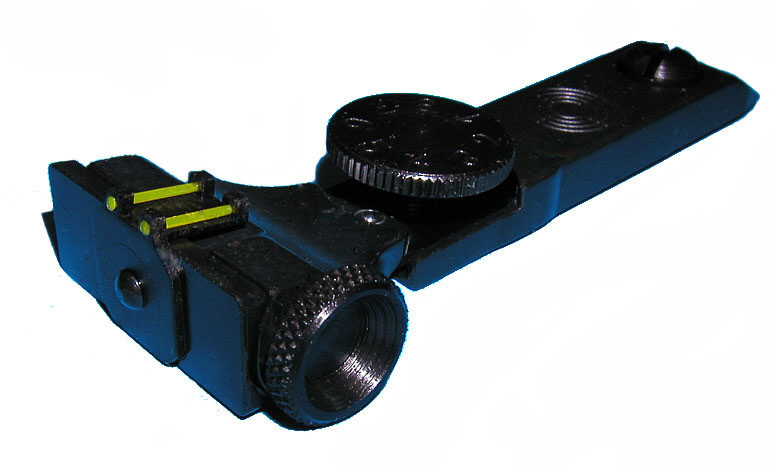
Green fiber optic contrast enhancement rods used in an adjustable open sight rear element

While target shooters generally prefer a matte black finish to their sights, to reduce the chance of glare and increase the contrast between the sights and the light bars, black sights don't offer good visibility with dark targets or in low light conditions, such as those often encountered in hunting, military, or self-defense situations. A variety of different contrast enhancements to the basic Patridge type sight and others have been developed to address this deficiency. The contrast enhancement of the front sight has to be somewhat larger compared to the contrast enhancement(s) used for the rear sight if all contrast enhancements should appear about equally large from the shooters perspective.

Three-dot
On semi-automatic handguns, the most common type of enhancement is a bright white dot painted on the front sight near the top of the blade, and a dot on each side of the rear sight notch. In low lighting conditions the front sight dot is centered horizontally between the rear sight dots, with the target placed above the middle (front) dot. Some sight vendors offer differently colored dots for the front and rear sights.
White outline rear
A contrast variation which uses a dot front sight with a thick and bright white outline around the rear sight notch.
Straight eight
Heinie Specialty Products produces a variant of high visibility sights in which a single dot front sight and a rear notch with a dot below can be lined up vertically to form a figure eight.
Sight inserts
Popular on revolvers, this enhancement consists of a colored plastic insert in the front sight blade, usually red or orange in color.
Bar / dot or express sight
Similar to the straight eight type, this type of sight is traditional on express rifles and is also found on some handguns. The open, V-shaped rear allows for faster acquisition and wider field of view, though less accurate for longer range precision type shooting. The dot on the front sight is aligned or set directly above the vertical bar on the rear sight, commonly referred to as "dotting the 'I'".
Gold bead
Preferred by many competitors in IPSC and IDPA shooting.
Night sights
On tactical firearms, the contrast enhancements can consist of small vials containing tritium gas whose radioactive decay causes a fluorescent material to glow. Self-luminous tritium sights provide vital visibility in extremely low light situations where normal sights would be degraded or even useless. The tritium glow is not noticeable in bright conditions such as daylight however. As a result, some manufacturers have started to integrate fiber optic sights with tritium vials to provide bright, high-contrast firearms sights in both bright and dim conditions.
Fiber optic
A growing trend, started on air rifles and muzzleloaders, is the use of short pieces of optical fiber for the dots, made in such a way that ambient light falling on the length of the fiber is concentrated at the tip, making the dots slightly brighter than the surroundings. This method is most commonly used in front sights, but many makers offer sights that use fiber optics on front and rear sights. Fiber optic sights can now be found on handguns, rifles, and shotguns, both as aftermarket accessories and a growing number of factory guns.

== See also ==
- Laser sight
- List of telescope parts and construction
- Reflex sight
- Telescopic sight
