= Natural point of aim =

Natural point of aim (NPOA or NPA), also known as natural aiming area (NAA), is a shooting skill where the shooter minimizes the effects of body movement on the firearm's impact point. Along with proper stance, sight alignment, sight picture, breath control, and trigger control, it forms the basis of marksmanship.

== Process ==
To achieve natural point of aim, the shooter settles into position while not looking through the sights. Some shooters actually close their eyes, but this can upset the natural maintenance of balance because the brain uses visual cues to help stay in balance. The shooter looks through the sights only after ensuring the position is comfortable and the firearm is resting in the stance with minimal muscle tension. If the sights are not resting on the desired point of impact, the shooter adjusts the position by repeating the same steps until the sights rest on the target. After achieving a comfortable and natural position, if the sights are not on the target, the shooter adjusts his stance (moves his feet) until the sights are on target. The arm, head and body position do not change; when standing only the feet are moved to bring the sights onto target.

Natural point of aim is not achieved if the shooter must apply pressure to the firearm so the sight picture is on target. One of the main advantages of natural point of aim is that it minimizes fatigue when shooting a long course of fire. Over time, the shooter learns to assume the correct position quickly, allowing for accurate fire immediately.

== Purpose ==
The main purpose of identifying and potentially correcting natural point of aim is to make shots with both accuracy and precision, where accuracy is the ability to place rounds on the desired target, and precision is the ability to put multiple rounds in the same location. Good shooters are always precise, and this skill is more fundamental than accuracy, which can be adjusted. Typically, precision is based on natural point of aim. Fire 10 rounds downrange and they will, hopefully, all land in a similar area on the target. This is the natural point of aim. If the strike zone is not in the middle of the target, adjustments are made to the shooter's positioning and/or the firearm's sights so that the shots accurately strike the centre of the target.

== Concept ==
Natural point of aim marksmanship is based on the idea that muscular control is insufficient to provide a stable platform for shooting, especially more than one shot. Instead, the shooter relies on non-muscular (skeleton/ligaments/tissue) support to provide the shooting platform. This eliminates changes in aim due to muscle fatigue and also minimizes the shaking associated with muscle tension.

Natural point of aim is a concept that can be used in relation to any type of shooting position but is most often discussed in relation to prone, sitting, or kneeling positions, and less frequently with offhand/standing positions.

== Methods of alteration ==
There are often many points that can be relaxed enough for the shooter to assume as a natural point of aim; in this way, the natural point of aim can be altered based on whatever the shooter finds most comfortable. However, the natural point of aim is a fixed point. It can only be moved when the shooter moves their feet, due to the point’s reliance upon a relaxed position.
