= List of revolvers =

This is a list of single- and double-action revolvers, listed alphabetically by manufacturer.

Name	Manufacturer	Image	Cartridge	Chambers	Country	Production date
1872 Swiss revolver	Pirlot Frères		.41 Rimfire	6	Switzerland; Belgium	1872–?
AAI underwater revolver	AAI Corporation			6	United States	1967
Adams	Deane, Adams&Deane		.450 Adams	5-6	United Kingdom	1851
Apache revolver	L. Dolne à Liege		7mm Lefaucheux	6	Belgium	1869 only
Arminius HW Revolver Series	Weihrauch & Weihrauch GmbH & Co. KG		.22 LR.22 WMR.32 S&W Long.38 Special.357 Magnum	8 round (HW-22); 6 (HW-38, HW-357)	Germany	1960–?
Armscor M200	Armscor		.38 Special	6	Philippines	1987-?
Astra 680	Astra-Unceta y Cia SA		.22 LR.22 Winchester Magnum Rimfire.32 Smith & Wesson Long.38 Special	8 6	Spain	1981–1996
Astra Model 44	Astra-Unceta y Cia SA		.41 Magnum.44 Magnum.45 Long Colt	6	Spain	1980–1989
Beaumont–Adams revolver	Robert Adams of London		.479 inch.338 inch.442 Webley	5	United Kingdom	1862–1880
Beretta Laramie	Fabbrica d' Armi Pietro Beretta S.p.A.		.45 Long Colt.38 Special	6	Italy	2005-2008
Beretta Stampede	Fabbrica d' Armi Pietro Beretta S.p.A.		.45 Long Colt.357 Magnum	6	Italy	2000-2013
Bodeo Model 1889			10.35mm Ordinanza Italiana	6	Italy	1889–c. 1931
Bossu Revolver	Manufacture d'armes Lepage		.25 ACP; 8mm French Ordnance	5	Belgium	1890
British Bull Dog revolver	Webley & Scott		.44 Bull Dog.442 Webley.450 Adams	5	United Kingdom	1872–1900s
Charter Arms Bulldog	Charter Arms		.44 Special.357 Magnum.38 Special	5	United States	1973–present
Chiappa Rhino	Chiappa Firearms		.357 Magnum; 9mm Parabellum.40 S&W; 9×21mm.38 Special	6	Italy	2010–present
Collier's Flintlock Revolver	John Evans & Son of London			5-7	United States; United Kingdom	1819–1824
Colombo-Ricci revolver			10.35mm Ordinanza Italiana	6	Italy	c.1910–?
Colt 1851 Navy Revolver	Colt's Manufacturing Company		.36 caliber ball.38 rimfire.38 Short Colt	6	United States	1851–1873
Colt Anaconda	Colt's Manufacturing Company		.44 Special.44 Magnum.45 Colt	6	United States	1990–2003; 2021–present
Colt Army Model 1860	Colt's Manufacturing Company		Paper-wrapped .44 caliber.44 Colt	6	United States	1860–1873
Colt Buntline	Colt's Manufacturing Company		.45 Colt	6	United States	1957–1992
Colt Cobra	Colt's Manufacturing Company		.38 Special.38 Colt New Police.32 Colt New Police.22 LR.357 Magnum	6	United States	1950–1981; 2017–present
Colt Detective Special	Colt's Manufacturing Company		.32 Colt New Police.38 Colt New Police.38 Special	6	United States	1927–1986; 1993–1995
Colt Diamondback	Colt's Manufacturing Company		.22 LR.22 WMR.38 Special	6	United States	1966–1988
Colt Dragoon Revolver	Colt's Manufacturing Company		.44 inch ball	6	United States	1848–1860
Colt House Revolver	Colt's Manufacturing Company		.41 Rimfire	4-5	United States	1871–1876
Colt King Cobra	Colt's Manufacturing Company		.38 Special.357 Magnum	6	United States	1986–1992; 1994–1998; 2019–present
Colt M1861 Navy	Colt's Manufacturing Company		Paper-wrapped .36 caliber.38 Short Colt	6	United States	1861–1873
Colt M1877	Colt's Manufacturing Company		.32 Colt.38 Long Colt.41 Long Colt	6	United States	1877–1909
Colt M1878	Colt's Manufacturing Company		.45 Colt.32-20 WCF.38 Long Colt.38-40 WCF.41 Colt.44-40 WCF.455 Webley.476 Eley	6	United States	1878–1907
Colt M1889	Colt's Manufacturing Company		.41 Long Colt.38 Long Colt.38 Short Colt		United States	1889–1909
Colt M1892	Colt's Manufacturing Company		.38 Long Colt.41 Long Colt	6	United States	1892–1908
Colt Model 1855 Sidehammer Pocket Revolver	Colt's Patent Firearms Manufacturing Company		.31 ball/conical bullet.28 ball/conical bullet	5	United States	c. 1855–1870
Colt Model 1871–72 Open Top	Colt's Patent Firearms Manufacturing Company		.44 Henry	6	United States	1871–1873
Colt Model 1905 Marine Corps	Colt's Manufacturing Company		.38 S&W		United States	1905–1909
Colt New Line	Colt's Patent Firearms Manufacturing Company		.30 Caliber.32 Long Colt.38 Caliber.41 Short Colt.41 Long Colt.22 Short.22 Long	5 7	United States	1873
Colt New Police Revolver	Colt's Patent Firearms Manufacturing Company		.32 Colt New Police	6	United States	1896–1907
Colt New Service	Colt's Patent Firearms Manufacturing Company		.45 Colt.455 Webley.476 Enfield.45 ACP.44-40 WCF.44 Special.38-40.38 Special.357 Magnum	6	United States	1898–1946
Colt Officer's Model	Colt's Patent Firearms Manufacturing Company		.22 LR.32-20 Winchester.38 Special.38 Long Colt	6	United States	1904–1972
Colt Official Police	Colt's Patent Firearms Manufacturing Company		.22 LR.32-20.38 Special.38/200.41 Long Colt	6	United States	1908–1969
Colt Open Top Pocket Model Revolver	Colt's Patent Firearms Manufacturing Company		.22 Short.22 long	7	United States	1871–1877
Colt Paterson	Colt's Patent Firearms Manufacturing Company		.36–.380-inch ball	5	United States	1836–1842
Colt Pocket Percussion Revolvers	Colt's Patent Firearms Manufacturing Company		.31 ball/conical bullet.36 caliber	5-6	United States	c. 1847–1873
Colt Police Positive	Colt's Patent Firearms Manufacturing Company		.32 Long/Short Colt.32 Colt New Police.38 Colt New Police.22 LR.22 Winchester Magnum Rimfire	6	United States	1907–1947
Colt Police Positive Special	Colt's Manufacturing Company		.32 Colt New Police.38 Colt New Police.32-20.38 Special	6	United States	1907–1995
Colt Python	Colt's Patent Firearms Manufacturing Company		.357 Magnum	6	United States	1955–2005 (First generation); 2020–present (Second generation)
Colt Single Action Army	Colt's Patent Firearms Manufacturing Company		.45 Colt.44-40 WCF.38-40 WCF.32-20 WCF.38 Long Colt.22 LR.38 Special.357 Magnum.44 Special.45 ACP	6	United States	1873–1941; 1956–1974; 1976–1982; 1994–present
Colt Trooper	Colt's Manufacturing Company		.22 LR.22 Winchester Magnum Rimfire.38 Special.357 Magnum	6	United States	1953–1985
Colt Walker	Eli Whitney Blake		.44 ball (.454 in)	6	United States	1847–?
Dan Wesson Model 14 & 15 Dan Wesson Model 14-2 & 15-2	Dan Wesson Arms Inc.		.357 Magnum	6	United States	1971–1974 (Model 14 & 15); c.1976–? (Model 14-2 & 15-2)
Dan Wesson Model 715	CZ-USA		.357 Magnum	6	United States	1982–?
Danish 1865/97 revolver	Kjøbenhavns Tøjhus		.45		Denmark	1897–1899
Dardick Model 1500	Dardick Corporation		.38 Dardick Tround.30 Dardick Tround.22 Dardick Tround	11-15	United States	1954
Enfield revolver	RSAF Enfield		.476" Revolver Mk II	6	United Kingdom	1880–1889
Enfield No. 2	Royal Small Arms Factory		.38/200	6	United Kingdom	1932–1957
FAMAE revolver	FAMAE		.32 Long Colt.38 Special	6	Chile	1980's
FitzGerald Special	John Henry FitzGerald		.38 Special.45 Colt	6	United States	1920s
FN Barracuda	Astra-Unceta y Cia SA		9×19mm Parabellum.357 Magnum.38 Special	6	Belgium; Spain	1974-c.1989
Freedom Arms Model 83 .500 WE	Freedom Arms		.500 Wyoming Express	5	United States	1983–present (designed in 1950s)
Frontier Bulldog	J.B. Rongé & Sons		.442 Webley.450 Adams	5	Belgium	c. 1875–1914
Garcia-Reynoso revolver	captain Antonio García Reynoso		7.8×30mm	5 (+ 5 extra rounds)	Argentina	1894
Gward revolver	KMW "Wifama"		.38 Special	6	Poland	1993–1997
Henrion, Dassy & Heuschen double-barrel revolvers	Henrion, Dassy & Heuschen		.25 ACP; 6.5 Velodog.32 ACP	16-20	Belgium; France	1911–1928
High Standard .22 revolver	High Standard Manufacturing Company		.22 Short.22 Long.22 LR	9	United States	1955–1980s
IOF .32 Revolver	Indian Ordnance Factory		.32 S&W Long	6	India	1996–present
IOF .22 revolver	Indian Ordnance Factory		.22 Long Rifle	8	India	2002
Iver Johnson Safety Automatic	Iver Johnson		.32 S&W.38 S&W	6	United States	1894–1895 (1st model); 1896–1908 (2nd model); 1909–1941 (3rd model)
Janz	Janz-Präzisionstechnik GmbH		.22 LR.44 Magnum.454 Casull.460 S&W.500 S&W.357 Magnum		Germany	1997
JTL-E .500 S&W Magnum 12"	Janz-Präzisionstechnik GmbH		.500 S&W Magnum	5	Germany	
MP-412 REX	Izhevsk Mechanical Plant		.357 Magnum.38 Special	6	Russia	1993 (never entered production)
Kerr's Patent Revolver	London Armoury Company		.36 inch.44 inch	5	United Kingdom	1859–1866
Korth Combat	Korth		.357 Magnum.38 Special; 9×19mm Parabellum.44 Magnum.44 Special	6	West Germany	1964–present
Landstad revolver	Halvard Landstad		7.5mm 1882 Ordnance	2 (+ 6 extra rounds)	Norway	1900 (never entered production)
LATEK Safari RF	LATEK		4 mm Flobert Long	9	Ukraine	2005-present
Lefaucheux M1854	Casimir Lefaucheux		12 mm Lefaucheux pinfire	6	France	1854–1870
Lefaucheux M1858	Casimir Lefaucheux		12 mm Lefaucheux	6	France	1858–1865
Lefaucheux-Francotte M. 71	Francotte		11 mm	6	Belgium	1871
LeMat Revolver	Jean Alexandre LeMat		.42 ball.36 ball 20 gauge	10 (9 rifled + 1 smoothbore)	Confederate States	1856–1865
Llama Super Comanche	Llama Firearms		.44 Magnum	6	Spain	1978–1994
Ganahl Revolver	K. u k. priv. Maschinen-Fabrik		9 mm (0.35 in)	6	Austria-Hungary	1849
Gasser M1870	Leopold Gasser Waffenfabrik		11.3×36mmR 'Montenegrin'	6	Austria-Hungary	1870–1919
M1879 Reichsrevolver	V.C. Schilling & Cie; Spangenberg & Sauer; C.G. Haenel; Mauser; Königliche Gewehrfabrik Erfurt		10.6×25mmR	6	Germany	1879–1908
M1917 revolver	Colt's Manufacturing Company; Smith & Wesson		.45 ACP.45 Auto Rim	6	United States	1917–1920
Magnum Research BFR	Magnum Research		.30-30 Winchester.38-55 Winchester.375 Winchester.444 Marlin.45 Colt.410.45-70 Government.45-90 Sharps.450 Marlin.460 S&W Magnum.500 S&W Magnum.50 Beowulf.22 Hornet.218 Bee.44 Remington Magnum.454 Casull.480 Ruger.475 Linebaugh.50 GI.50 Action Express.500 JRH	5	United States	2000s–?
Manurhin MR 73	Manurhin; Chapuis Armes		.22 LR.32 S&W Long; 9mm Parabellum.38 Special.357 Magnum	6	France	1972–present
MAS 1873 revolver	Manufacture d'armes de Saint-Étienne		11 mm Mle 1873	6	France	1873–1887
Mateba Autorevolver	Macchine Termo-Balistiche		.357 Magnum.44 Magnum.454 Casull	6	Italy	1997–2005
Mauser C78 "zig-zag"	Mauser		various	6	Germany	1878–1896
Medusa Model 47	Phillips & Rodgers Inc.		.38 caliber 9 mm caliber	6	United States	1996–2001
MIL Thunder 5	MIL, Inc.		.410 bore.45 Colt.45-70 Government	5	United States	1992–1998
Modèle 1892 revolver	Manufacture d'armes de Saint-Étienne		8mm French Ordnance	6	France	1892–1924
MP-412 REX	Izhevsk Mechanical Plant		.357 Magnum.38 Special	6	Russia	1993
Nagant M1895	Nagant; Tula Arms Plant; Izhevsk; Państwowa Fabryka Karabinów		7.62×38mmR	7	Belgium; Russia	1895–1945
Nagant wz. 30	FB "Łucznik" Radom		7.62×38mmR	7	Poland	1930–1935
New Nambu M60	Minebea		.38 Special	5	Japan	1960–1999
Nidar	Ordnance Factories Board		.22 LR	8	India	2016
Nirbheek	Indian Ordnance Factories		.32 S&W Long	6	India	2014–present
Norinco 9mm Police Revolver	Norinco		9×19mm Parabellum	6	China	2006–present
NRP9 Police Revolver	Norinco		.38 caliber	6	China	2014–?
OTs-01 Kobalt	KBP Instrument Design Bureau		9×18mm Makarov.380 ACP	6	Soviet Union	1992–2002 (OTs-01); 1996–present (OTs-01S)
OTs-20 Gnom	KBP Instrument Design Bureau		12.5×40mm STs-110	5	Russia	1994–?
OTs-38 Stechkin silent revolver	KBP Instrument Design Bureau		7.62×42mm	5	Russia	2002–present
Pfeifer Zeliska .600 Nitro Express revolver	Pfeifer Waffen		.600 Nitro Express	5	Austria	c.2007–?
Pistola con caricato			6.35×15 mmSR	18	Italy; Spain	1900s
Prabal	Advanced Weapons and Equipment India		.32 S&W Long		India	2023
Protector Palm Pistol	Systeme E. Turbiaux		6 mm 8 mm.32 Extra Short	7-8	France	1882
Rast & Gasser M1898	Rast & Gasser		8mm Gasser	8	Austria-Hungary	1898–1919
Remington-Beals Pocket Revolver	Remington Arms		.31	5	United States	1856–1860
Remington Model 1858	Remington Arms		.31.36.44 percussion.32 rimfire.38 Long Colt.38 rimfire.46 rimfire	5-6	United States	1858–1875
Remington Model 1875	Remington Arms		.45 Colt.44-40 Winchester.44 Remington	6	United States	1875–1889
Remington Model 1890 Remington Model 1888 (Transitional) Single Action Army	Remington Arms		.44-40 Winchester.44-40 Winchester.44 Remington	6	United States	1890–1896 (Model 1890) 1888–1889 (Model 1888 Transitional)
Remington–Smoot No. 1 Revolver	Remington Arms		.30	5	United States	1875–1877
Revolver 1882, 1882/1929	Waffenfabrik Bern		7.5mm 1882 Ordnance	6	Switzerland	1882–1929 (Revolver M1882); 1929–1946 (Model 1929)
RMR	Manurhin; Sturm, Ruger & Co.		.357 Magnum		France; United States	1981–1984
Röhm RG-14	Röhm Gesellschaft		.22 LR	6	West Germany	1980-s
Rossi Model 51 Rossi Model 518	Amadeo Rossi		.22 LR	6	Brazil	1981–1985
Rossi Model 68	Amadeo Rossi		.38 Special	5	Brazil	1978-X
Rossi Model 851	Amadeo Rossi		.38 Special	6	Brazil	2001–2017
Rossi Model 971	Amadeo Rossi		.38 Special.357 Magnum	6	Brazil	1988–2017
Rossi Model 988	Amadeo Rossi		.357 Magnum	6	Brazil	1997–2017
Rossi Princess	Amadeo Rossi		.22 LR	6	Brazil	1957–1984
Rossi R46102	Amadeo Rossi		.357 Magnum.38 Special	6	Brazil	
Rossi R97206	Amadeo Rossi		.38 Special.357 Magnum	6	Brazil	2001–present
RSh-12	KBP Instrument Design Bureau		12.7×55mm STs-130	5	Russia	2000–present
Ruger Bearcat	Sturm, Ruger & Co.		.22 LR.22 Long.22 Short.22 WMR	6	United States	1958–1971 (1st issue); 1971–1975 (2nd issue); 1993–present (3rd issue)
Ruger Blackhawk	Sturm, Ruger & Co.		.30 Carbine.32 H&R Magnum.32-20 Winchester.327 Federal Magnum; 9×19mm Parabellum.357 Magnum.357 Remington Maximum; 10mm Auto.38-40 Winchester.40 S&W.41 Magnum.44 Special.44-40 WCF.44 Magnum.45 ACP.45 Colt.454 Casull.480 Ruger	6	United States	1955–present
Ruger GP100	Sturm, Ruger & Co.		.44 Special.357 Magnum.38 Special; 10mm Auto.327 Federal Magnum.357 Magnum.22 LR	5 6 7 10	United States	1985–present
Ruger LCR	Sturm, Ruger & Co.		.38 Special.357 Magnum; 9×19mm Luger.22 WMR.327 Federal Magnum.22 LR	5 6 8	United States	2010–present
Ruger Old Army	Sturm, Ruger & Co.		.44 caliber	6	United States	1972–2008
Ruger Redhawk	Sturm, Ruger & Co.		.38 Special.357 Magnum.41 Magnum.44 Special.44 Magnum.45 Colt	6	United States	1979–present
Ruger Security-Six	Sturm, Ruger & Co.		.38 S&W.38 Special.357 Magnum; 9×19mm Parabellum	6	United States	1972–1988
Ruger Single-Six	Sturm, Ruger & Co.		.22 LR.22 WMR.17 HMR.32 H&R Magnum	6	United States	1953–1973 (Old Model); 1973–present (New Model)
Ruger SP101	Sturm, Ruger & Co.		.38 Special.357 Magnum; 9mm Luger (discontinued).327 Federal Magnum.32 H&R Magnum (discontinued).22 LR	5 6 8	United States	1989–present
Ruger Super Redhawk Ruger Alaskan	Sturm, Ruger & Co.		.44 Magnum.454 Casull.480 Ruger; 10mm Auto.480 Ruger.44 Magnum.454 Casull	5-6	United States	1987–present 2005–?
Ruger Vaquero	Sturm, Ruger & Co.		.357 Magnum.38 Special.44-40 Winchester.44 Magnum.44 Special.45 Colt	6	United States	1993–present
Ruger Wrangler	Sturm, Ruger & Co.		.22 long rifle	6	United States	2019–present
S333 Thunderstruck	Standard Manufacturing		.22 WMR	8	United States	2019–present
Savage 1861 Navy	Savage Revolving Firearms Company		.36 Ball	6	United States	1861–1862
Schmidt M1882	Waffenfabrik Bern		7.5mm 1882 Ordnance	6	Switzerland	1882–1929
Series ALFA	ALF – PROJ spol. s r.o.		.357 Magnum	6	Czech Republic	1963-1977
Series ALFA Steel	ALF – PROJ spol. s r.o.		Various	6; 8; 9	Czech Republic	1993–present
Series HOLEK	ALF – PROJ spol. s r.o.		.38 Special	6	Czech Republic	1929-1939
Slocum revolver	Brooklyn Arms Co		.32 rimfire	5	United States	1864
Smith & Wesson .38/44	Smith & Wesson		.38 Special	6	United States	1930–1941; 1946–1966
Smith & Wesson Bodyguard	Smith & Wesson		.38 Special.357 Magnum	5	United States	1955–present
Smith & Wesson Centennial	Smith & Wesson		.22 LR.22 Magnum.32 H&R Magnum.357 Magnum.38 Special; 9mm Luger.356 TSW	5-6-7-8	United States	1952
Smith & Wesson Governor	Smith & Wesson		.410 bore.45 ACP.45 Colt	6	United States	2011–present
Smith & Wesson Ladysmith	Smith & Wesson		.22 Long.32 H&R Magnum.38 Special.357 Magnum; 9mm Parabellum	5-6	United States	1902–present
Smith & Wesson Model 1	Smith & Wesson		.22 Short	7	United States	1857–1882
Smith & Wesson Model 1 1/2	Smith & Wesson		.32 Rimfire.32 S&W	5	United States	1865–1892
Smith & Wesson Model 2	Smith & Wesson		.38 S&W	5	United States	1876–1911
Smith & Wesson Model 3	Smith & Wesson		.44 Russian.44 S&W American.38 S&W.44 Henry.44-40 Winchester.45 Schofield.32 S&W	6	United States	1868–1898
Smith & Wesson Model 10	Smith & Wesson		.38 Long Colt.38 Special.38/200	6	United States	1899–present
Smith & Wesson Model 12	Smith & Wesson		.38 Special	6	United States	1953–1986
Smith & Wesson Model 13	Smith & Wesson		.357 Magnum	6	United States	1974–1999
Smith & Wesson Model 14	Smith & Wesson		.38 Special	6	United States	1947–1982; 1991–1999; 2009–present
Smith & Wesson Model 15	Smith & Wesson		.38 Special	6	United States	1949–1999 (main production run); 2001–2002 (Heritage Series limited run); 2011–2013 (Classics Revolvers)
Smith & Wesson Model 17	Smith & Wesson		.22 Long Rifle	6-10	United States	1947–1998
Smith & Wesson Model 19	Smith & Wesson		.357 Magnum.38 Special	6	United States	1957–1999; 2018–present
Smith & Wesson Model 22	Smith & Wesson		.45 ACP.45 Auto Rim	6	United States	1950–2007
Smith & Wesson Model 27 Smith & Wesson Model 27-2 6"	Smith & Wesson		.357 Magnum	6	United States	1935–1944 (Original Model); 2008–present (Classic Model)
Smith & Wesson Model 28	Smith & Wesson		.357 Magnum	6	United States	1954–1986
Smith & Wesson Model 29	Smith & Wesson		.44 Magnum.44 Special	6	United States	1955–present
Smith & Wesson Model 30	Smith & Wesson		.32 Long.32 S&W	6	United States	1903–1976
Smith & Wesson Model 34 Kit Gun	Smith & Wesson		.22 LR	6	United States	1958–1991
Smith & Wesson Model 36	Smith & Wesson		.38 Special	5	United States	1950–?
Smith & Wesson Model 48 Smith & Wesson Model 648	Smith & Wesson		.22 Winchester Magnum Rimfire	6 6-8	United States	1959–1986; 1989–present 1989–1996; 2003–2005; 2019–present
Smith & Wesson Model 57	Smith & Wesson		.41 Magnum	6	United States	1964–1993; 2008–present
Smith & Wesson Model 60	Smith & Wesson		.38 Special.357 Magnum	5	United States	1965–present
Smith & Wesson Model 64	Smith & Wesson		.38 Special	6	United States	1970–2021
Smith & Wesson Model 73	Smith & Wesson		.38 Special	6	United States	1973
Smith & Wesson Model 317 kit gun	Smith & Wesson		.22 LR	8	United States	1998
Smith & Wesson Model 340PD	Smith & Wesson		.357 Magnum.38 Special	5	United States	1997–present
Smith & Wesson Model 386	Smith & Wesson		.38 Special.357 Magnum	7	United States	2001
Smith & Wesson Model 460	Smith & Wesson		.454 Casull.45 Colt.45 Schofield.460 S&W Magnum	5	United States	2005–present
Smith & Wesson Model 500	Smith & Wesson		.500 S&W Magnum.500 S&W Special	5	United States	2003–present
Smith & Wesson Model 586	Smith & Wesson		.357 Magnum.38 Special	6-7	United States	1981–1999; 2012–present
Smith & Wesson Model 610	Smith & Wesson		10mm Auto.40 S&W	6	United States	1990–1992; 1998; 2019
Smith & Wesson Model 619 & 620	Smith & Wesson		.357 Magnum.38 Special	7	United States	2005
Smith & Wesson Model 625	Smith & Wesson		.45 ACP.45 Auto Rim.45 Colt	6	United States	1989–present
Smith & Wesson Model 640	Smith & Wesson		.357 Magnum.38 Special	5	United States	1989–present
Smith & Wesson Model 646	Smith & Wesson		.40 S&W	6	United States	2000–2003
Smith & Wesson Model 686	Smith & Wesson		.357 Magnum.38 Special	6-7	United States	1981–present
Smith & Wesson Model 1905	Smith & Wesson		.38 Special	6	United States	1905–1942
Smith & Wesson Model No. 2 Army	Smith & Wesson		.32 rimfire	6	United States	1861–1874
Smith & Wesson Safety Hammerless	Smith & Wesson		.38 S&W.32 S&W	5	United States	1887–1940
Smith & Wesson Triple Lock	Smith & Wesson		.44 Special.455 Webley	6	United States	1908–1915
Starr revolver	Starr Arms Company		Ball, percussion cap #11	6	United States	Late 1850s to 1860s
Sterling Revolver	Sterling Armaments Company		.38 caliber	6	United Kingdom	1980s
Swiss mini gun	SwissMiniGun		2.34mm rimfire		Switzerland	
Taurus Judge	Taurus Armas		.410 bore.454 Casull.45 Colt.45 Schofield	5-6-7	Brazil	2006–present
Taurus Model 82	Taurus Armas		.38 Special	6	Brazil	c.1982–present
Taurus Model 85	Taurus Armas		.38 Special	5	Brazil	c.1980–present
Taurus Model 605	Taurus Armas		.38 Special.357 Magnum	5	Brazil	1995–present
Taurus Model 608	Taurus Armas		.357 Magnum	8	Brazil	2011–?
Taurus Model 617	Taurus Armas		.38 Special.357 Magnum	7	Brazil	1998–?
Taurus Model 689	Taurus Armas		.38 Special.357 Magnum	6	Brazil	1988–1998
Taurus Model 731	Taurus Armas		.32 Long.32 H&R Magnum	6	Brazil	1995–present
Taurus Raging Bull	Taurus Armas		.218 Bee.22 Hornet.30 Carbine.357 Magnum.41 Magnum.44 Magnum.45 Colt.410 bore.460 S&W Magnum.480 Ruger.500 S&W Magnum	5-6-7-8	Brazil	1996–2019 (Raging Bull line); 2019–present (Raging Hunter line)
Tranter (revolver)	Tranter			5-6	United Kingdom	c.1854-c.1880
Type 26 revolver	Koishikawa Arsenal		9mm Japanese revolver	6	Japan	1893–1935
U-94 UDAR	KBP Instrument Design Bureau		12.3×50mmR; 12.3×40mmR; 12.3×22mmR PM32; 9×18mm Makarov; 9×17mm Short	5	Russia	1994–?
Ultimate 500	Gary Reeder Custom Guns		.500 S&W Magnum	5	United States	c.2003–?
Union Automatic Revolver	Union Firearms Company		.32 S&W	5	United States	1909–1912
Velo-dog	René Galand		5.75mm Velo-dog	5	France	c. 1880–1890
Walch Revolver	Walch Firearms & Co.		.36 caliber cap and ball black powder	5-6	United States	1859–1862
Webley Longspur	Webley & Sons		.455	5	United Kingdom	1853–1865
Webley RIC	Webley & Scott		.442 Webley.450 Adams.500 Tranter	6	United Kingdom	1868–?
Webley Revolver Webley Mk IV .38/200 Service Revolver	Webley & Scott; RSAF Enfield		.455 Webley.45 ACP.38/200	6	United Kingdom	1887–1924: 1887 (Mark I); 1895 (Mark II); 1897 (Mark III); 1899 (Mark IV); 1913 (Mark V); 1915 (Mark VI); ---–1932–1978
Webley–Fosbery Automatic Revolver	Webley & Scott		.455 Webley.38 ACP	6 8	United Kingdom	1901–1924
Zastava M83	Zastava Arms		.357 Magnum.38 Special; 9×19mm Parabellum	6	Yugoslavia	1983
Zig Zag revolver			.38 Special	6	Japan	2014
ZKR 551	Česká zbrojovka Uherský Brod		7.62 Nagant.22 LR.32 S&W Long.38 Special	6	Czechoslovakia	1957–1971 (first run); 1990s–2006 (second run)
Zoraki R1	Atak Arms		4 mm Flobert Short; 6 mm Flobert/6 mm ME Flobert	9	Turkey	2006-present
Zulaica Automatic Revolver	M. Zulaica y Cia.		.22 Long Rifle	6	Spain	1905 or 1915–1920s

== See also ==
- List of firearms
- List of multiple-barrel firearms
- List of submachine guns
- List of assault rifles
- List of machine guns
- List of pistols
- List of semi-automatic pistols
- List of shotguns
- List of sniper rifles
