= Tranter =

Tranter may refer to:

- Clement John Tranter (1909-1991), British mathematician, academic, and author
- David Tranter, Australian sound recordist and filmmaker
- George Tranter (footballer, born 1886) (1886–1958), English footballer
- George Tranter (footballer, born 1915) (1915–1998), English footballer
- Jane Tranter (born 1963), English television executive
- John Tranter (1943–2023), Australian poet
- Nigel Tranter (1909–2000), Scottish writer
- Penny Tranter, British weather forecaster
- Richard Tranter (1893–1957), English footballer
- William Tranter (1816–1890), British gunmaker and gun designer
- Walter Tranter (1874–1945), English footballer

== See also ==
- Battle of Tranter's Creek
- Tranter (revolver)
