= Mayzus MZ-01 Drulov =

Mayzus MZ-01
- Type: Bolt action Pistol
- Place of origin: Czech Republic

Production history
- Manufacturer: Mayzus Gunsmith Company s.r.o.
- Unit cost: 9,900°°–12,575°°CZK, (about €415ºº– €520ºº EUR) in 2026
- Produced: 2015-present

Specifications
- Mass: 850 g (1.87 lb)
- Length: 280 mm (11 in)
- Barrel length: 160 mm (6.3 in)
- Cartridge: 6 mm Flobert Balle; 6 mm ME Flobert Court; 9 mm Flobert Bosquette
- Action: Bolt action
- Feed system: Single shot
- Sights: Fixed
- References: Prices andd specs according to manufacturer and distribuitors in Europe.

The Mayzus MZ-01 Drulov is a single-shot, bolt-action pistol manufactured in the Czech Republic by Mayzus Gunsmith Company s.r.o., designed to fire 6mm Flobert or 9mm Flobert cartridges.

== Design and development ==
Mayzus was founded in 2015 in the town of Dolní Ředice in the Czech Republic with the aim of producing sporting firearms primarily for Flobert cartridges. The name "Drulov" is inspired by the arms company founded in 1948 when the Czech Republic was still part of socialist Czechoslovakia. This company produced various low-cost sporting pistols in .22LR (like the Drulov Model 70) and 9mm calibers and, until 2010, was still producing the Drulov DU-10, a 4.5mm caliber competition pistol powered by CO2.

The MZ-01 Drulov is a bolt-action, single-shot pistol. It is made of steel, machined using chip removal processes, and has a blued finish. The muzzle is threaded for the attachment of accessories such as silencers or weight compensators. The grip is made of wood with an ergonomic design and varnished finish, and both sights are fixed. The weapon is available for both the 6mm Flobert and 9mm Flobert cartridges; in both models, the barrel is rifled. It is considered a youth training weapon, designed to help novice shooters acquire proper firearm handling habits.
