= Colt Officer's Model =

Colt Officer's Model may refer to:

- Colt Officer's ACP, a semi-automatic handgun
- Colt Officer's Model (revolver), a revolver
