= Two-Gun =

Two-Gun is a common nickname or epithet for gunslingers known to wield two handguns.

== People ==
- Francis Crowley, Two-Gun Crowley, or simply Two-Gun, an American serial killer
- Louis Alterie, or Two-Gun Alterie, an American gangster and hitman
- Richard James Hart, or Two-Gun Hart, an Italian-American prohibition agent
- Two-Gun Cohen, a Polish-British adventurer
- Willie "Two-Knife" Altieri, or Willie Two-Gun Altieri, an American gangster

== Arts, entertainment and media ==
=== Characters ===
- Two-Gun Kid, a character from Marvel Comics

=== Films ===
- The Two-Gun Man, a 1926 western by David Kirkland
- Two-Gun Betty, a 1918 comedy western by Howard Hickman
- Two-Gun Caballero, a 1931 western by Jack Nelson
- Two-Gun Gussie, a 1918 short comedy by Hal Roach
- Two Gun Justice, a 1938 western by Alan James
- Two Gun Law, a 1937 western by Leon Barsha
- Two Gun Man, a 1931 western by Phil Rosen
- Two Gun Man from Harlem, a 1938 contemporary western by Richard Kahn
- Two-Gun of the Tumbleweed, a 1927 western by Leo Maloney
- Two Gun Sheriff, a 1941 western by Doris Schroeder and George Sherman
- Two Gun Troubador, a 1939 western by Raymond Johnson

== Technology ==
- an early color television system; see Telechrome § Two-gun Telechrome
- Landstad revolver, a two-chambered automatic revolver, occasionally called the "two-gun"

== See also ==
- Two Guns (disambiguation)
