= Landstad revolver =

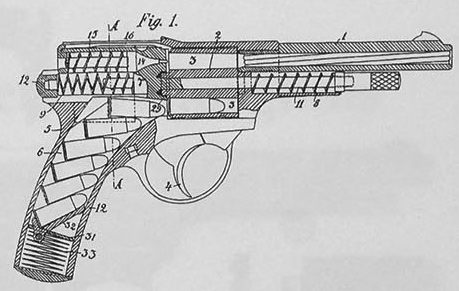
- A patent of the Landstad revolver, filed on the 11th of April, 1899
- Type: Revolver
- Place of origin: Norway

Production history
- Designer: Halvard Landstad
- Designed: 1900

Specifications
- Cartridge: 7.5mm 1882 Ordnance
- Caliber: 7.5mm
- Action: Blowback
- Feed system: Single-stack, single-row-feed magazine

The Landstad revolver was an automatic revolver of Norwegian origin. The weapon had an unusual feeding device that used both a two-round cylinder and a grip-inserted magazine.

It was chambered for 7.5mm Nagant, which at the time of the creation of the Landstad was also used in the Swedish Model 1887 and Norwegian Model 1893 Nagant revolvers.

== History ==
The revolver design was patented in 1899 by Halvard Landstad, from Kristiania (now Oslo). Landstad developed it with his own money and presented it to military trials in 1901.

The gun never went into production because the revolver failed in the trials, but the inventor kept a prototype of the gun. It was donated to the British National Rifle Association after the inventor's death in 1955. In 1977 the revolver was sold in an auction.

== See also ==
- Dardick 1500
- Mateba 6 Unica
- Webley Fosbery
