= 1872 Swiss revolver =

Swiss firearm

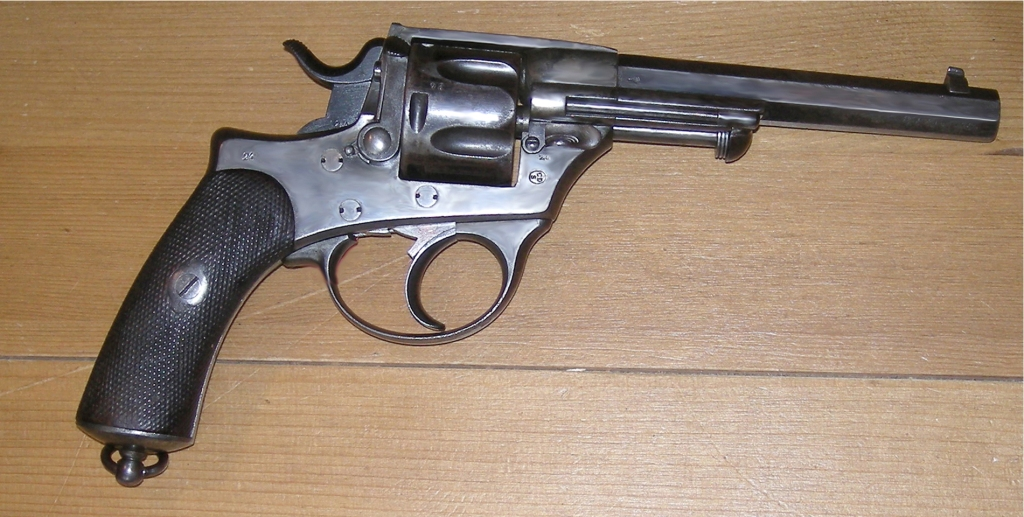
Revolver Model 1872

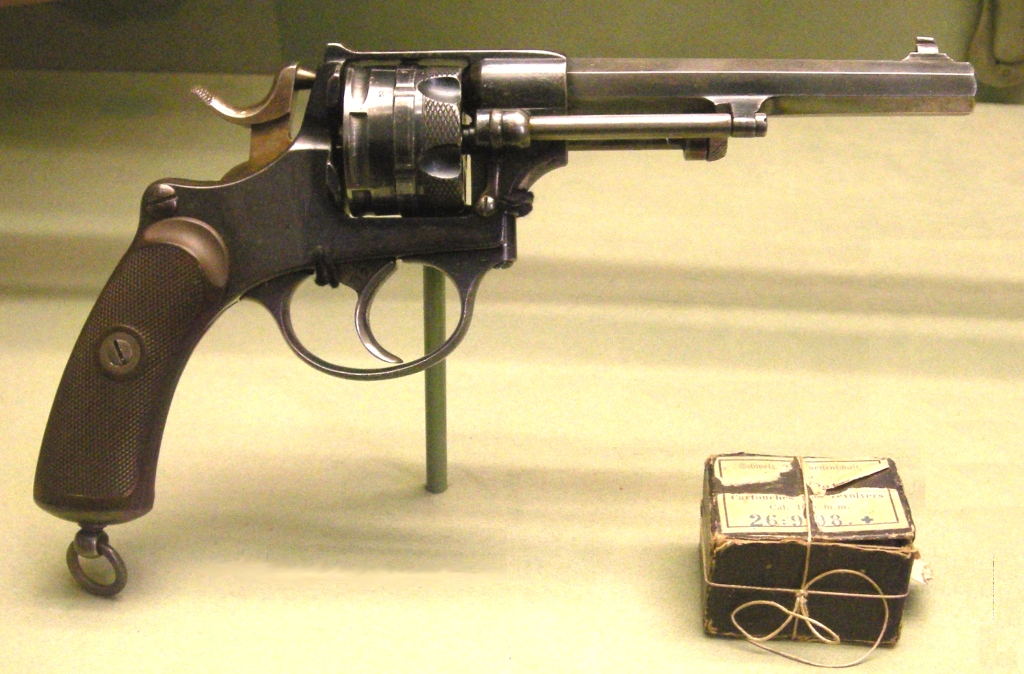
Revolver Model 1878, on display at Morges castle museum.

The Model 1872 revolver (Ordonnanzrevolver 1872 or revolver d'ordonnance modèle 1872) was the service sidearm of the Swiss Army. It was later refined to the Model 1872/78 revolver. Approximately 600 were manufactured in Belgium by Pirlot Frères.

== Model 1872 ==
The Model 1872 and 1872/78 revolvers operated in both single action and double action, with empty cartridges individually ejected by an ejector rod. They were very similar in design to the French military MAS 1873 Chamelot-Delvigne revolver. The 1872 revolver used 10.4mm (.41 Swiss) rimfire cartridges.

== The Model 1872/78 ==
In 1878 the Swiss adopted the 10.4mm centerfire for their new Model 1878 revolver and most of their 1872 revolvers were adapted to this cartridge and named the 1872/78 model.

== The Model 1878 ==
The Model 1878 was chambered specifically for a centerfire cartridge. Its mechanism is the Warnant system with a rebounding hammer modified by Lieutenant-Colonel Rudolf Schmidt. In contrast with the Model 1872, it has no loading gate but is designed to index the chambers of the cylinder with an ejector rod. They were manufactured in Switzerland by Waffenfabrik Bern. After 1882, they were replaced by the Schmidt M1882 service revolver.
