= Two Guns =

Two Guns may refer to:

- 2 Guns, a 2013 American action comedy film by Baltasar Kormákur
- Two Guns, Arizona, ghost town
- Lefty Ruggiero, or Lefty Two Guns, an American mobster
- John Two Guns White Calf, a chief of the Piegan Blackfeet

== See also ==
- Two Gun (disambiguation)
