= 10.4mm Swiss Centerfire =

Revolver cartridge

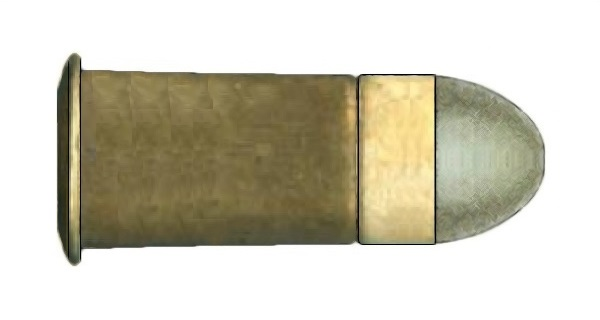
- Type: revolver

Service history
- In service: 1878-1882
- Used by: Swiss Army

Production history
- Designer: Lieutenant-Colonel Rudolf Schmidt
- Designed: 1878

Specifications
- Parent case: 10.4×18mm Swiss Rimfire
- Case type: Rimmed, straight
- Bullet diameter: 10.76 mm (0.424 in)
- Neck diameter: 10.8 mm (0.43 in)
- Base diameter: 11.2 mm (0.44 in)
- Rim diameter: 13.3 mm (0.52 in)
- Rim thickness: 1.1 mm (0.043 in)
- Case length: 20 mm (0.79 in)
- Overall length: 32 mm (1.3 in)

Ballistic performance
Bullet mass/type	Velocity	Energy
12.5 g (193 gr) lead 1 g of black powder	185 m/s (610 ft/s)	213 J (157 ft⋅lbf)

The 10.4mm Swiss centerfire / 10.4x20mmR revolver cartridge was used in the Ordnance Revolver models 1872/78 and 1878 of the Swiss Army. The case is of brass; the bullet is of hardened lead.

== Dimensions ==
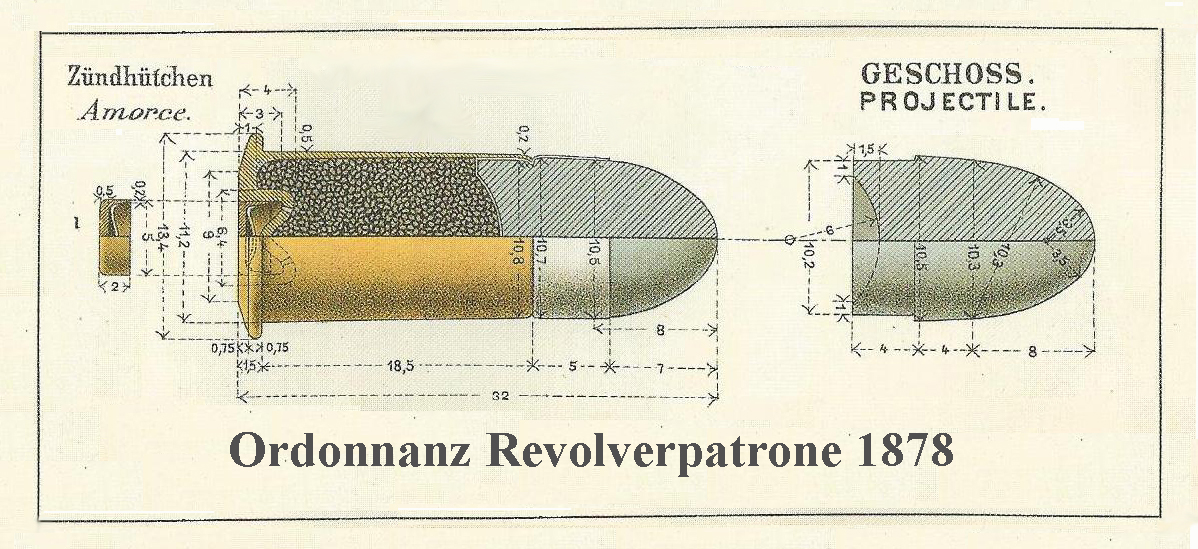
Cartridge 10.4mm Swiss center-fire 1878.

== See also ==
- List of rimmed cartridges
