= Drulov Target Pistols =

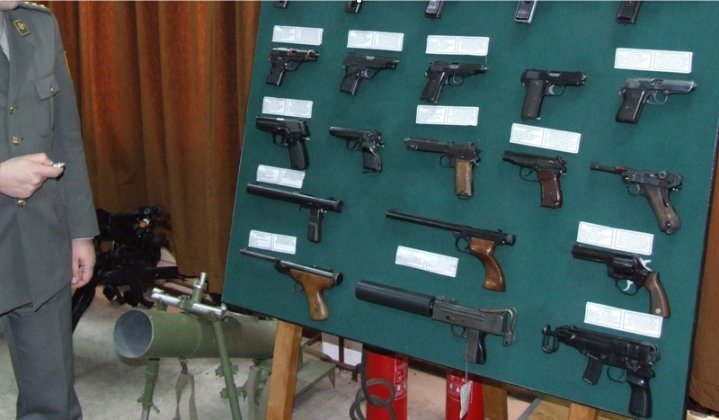
- Unknown, unknown, unknown, Ruby pistol, unknown SIG Sauer P220, unknown, Steyr M1912, Makarov PM, Parabellum pistol Welrod, Drulov 70, Zastava M83; Slavia ZVP air pistol, MAC-11, Škorpion vz 61
- Type: Bolt action Pistol
- Place of origin: Czechoslovakia

Production history
- Manufacturer: Lidové Družstvo Puškařů "Lověna"
- Produced: 1963-1970s

Specifications
- Mass: 1,250 g (2.76 lb)-1,265 g (2.789 lb)
- Length: 365 mm (14.4 in)
- Barrel length: 250 mm (9.8 in)
- Cartridge: .22 long rifle
- Action: Bolt action
- Feed system: Single shot
- Sights: Front: Fixed rear: Adjustable
- References: Ian Hogg

The Drulov target pistol series—which includes Models 65, 70, and 75 is a family of single-shot, bolt-action pistols manufactured by the Czechoslovak state-owned company Lidové Družstvo Puškařů "Lověna" (translated as: "Lověna" People's Gunsmiths' Cooperative) in Litomyšl during the 1960s and 1970s.

== Design and development ==
Drulov target pistols emerged following the nationalization of industries in Czechoslovakia, where the manufacture of sporting arms was reorganized into state-controlled cooperatives tasked with producing reliable, standardized firearms for both the domestic and export markets.

The first model in the family was the DruLov Model 65, which entered production in the 1960s; this model was eventually replaced by the DruLov Model 70. As these pistols were designed specifically for competitive shooting, they featured a long barrel for improved accuracy, a wide sight radius, anatomically designed grips (without wrist or forearm support), adjustable rear sights, and balanced weight distribution.

The design is a single-shot bolt-action type, utilizing a knurled rear knob that retracts the bolt and exposes the chamber. Closing the bolt seats the cartridge in the chamber and cocks the firing pin.

=== Versions ===
- Drulov Model 65: The first version produced by Lidové Družstvo Puškařů "Lověna", which was mainly characterized by a round bolt knob, mounted on the back of the same.
- Drulov Model 70 Standard:The version that replaced the Model 65; it slightly alters the design of the bolt knob and the trigger guard.
- Drulov Model 70 Special:A version featuring a trigger system with a "set-trigger" mechanism, in which the set-lever within the trigger guard readies the trigger while a separate button fires the shot, allowing for a significant reduction in the force required to pull the trigger during firing.
- Drulov Model 75: A version similar to the Model 70 Special, but featuring improvements to the sights and grips, as well as an upgraded "set-trigger" mechanism in which the set-lever returns to its original position upon release.
