= Colombo-Ricci revolver =

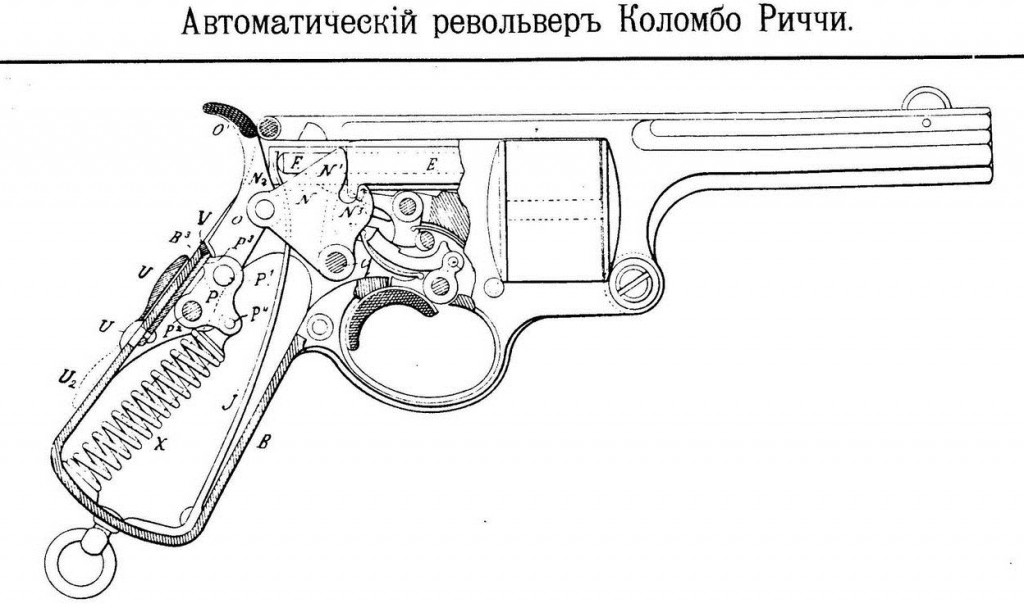
- A drawing of the revolver
- Type: Automatic Revolver
- Place of origin: Italy

Production history
- Designed: 1910s

Specifications
- Cartridge: 10.35 mm Ordinanza Italiana
- Caliber: 10.35 mm
- Barrels: 1
- Action: Blowback
- Rate of fire: Semi-automatic
- Feed system: Six-round cylinder

The Colombo-Ricci Revolver was an automatic revolver of Italian origin, designed around 1910. The weapon was chambered in the 10.35mm Ordinanza Italiana round.

== Design ==
The Colombo-Ricci revolver. is a blowback operated revolver that fires in semi auto, fed from a cylinder that rotates to the next round when fired ejecting the case much like an automatic firearm.

== See also ==
- List of revolvers
- Webley Fosbery
- Mateba Model 6 Unica
