= Richard Tranter =

English footballer

Personal information
- Full name: Richard Arthur Tranter
- Date of birth: 1893
- Place of birth: Bolton, England
- Date of death: 23 October 1957 (aged 63–64)
- Position: Inside forward

Senior career*
Years	Team	Apps	(Gls)
- Padiham
1913–1915	Burnley	5	(0)
Total		5	(0)
- * Club domestic league appearances and goals

Richard Arthur Tranter (1893–1957) was an English professional footballer who played for Burnley in the Football League as an inside forward.

== Personal life ==
Tranter served as a lance corporal in the King's Own (Royal Lancaster Regiment) during the First World War and received a gunshot wound to the head in February 1917. The wound led to his discharge from the army.

== Career statistics ==
Appearances and goals by club, season and competition
Club	Season	League			FA Cup		Total	
Club	Season	Division	Apps	Goals	Apps	Goals	Apps	Goals
Burnley	1914–15	First Division	2	0	0	0	2	0
Career total			2	0	0	0	2	0
