= Ganahl Revolver =

19th-century Austrian Empire revolver

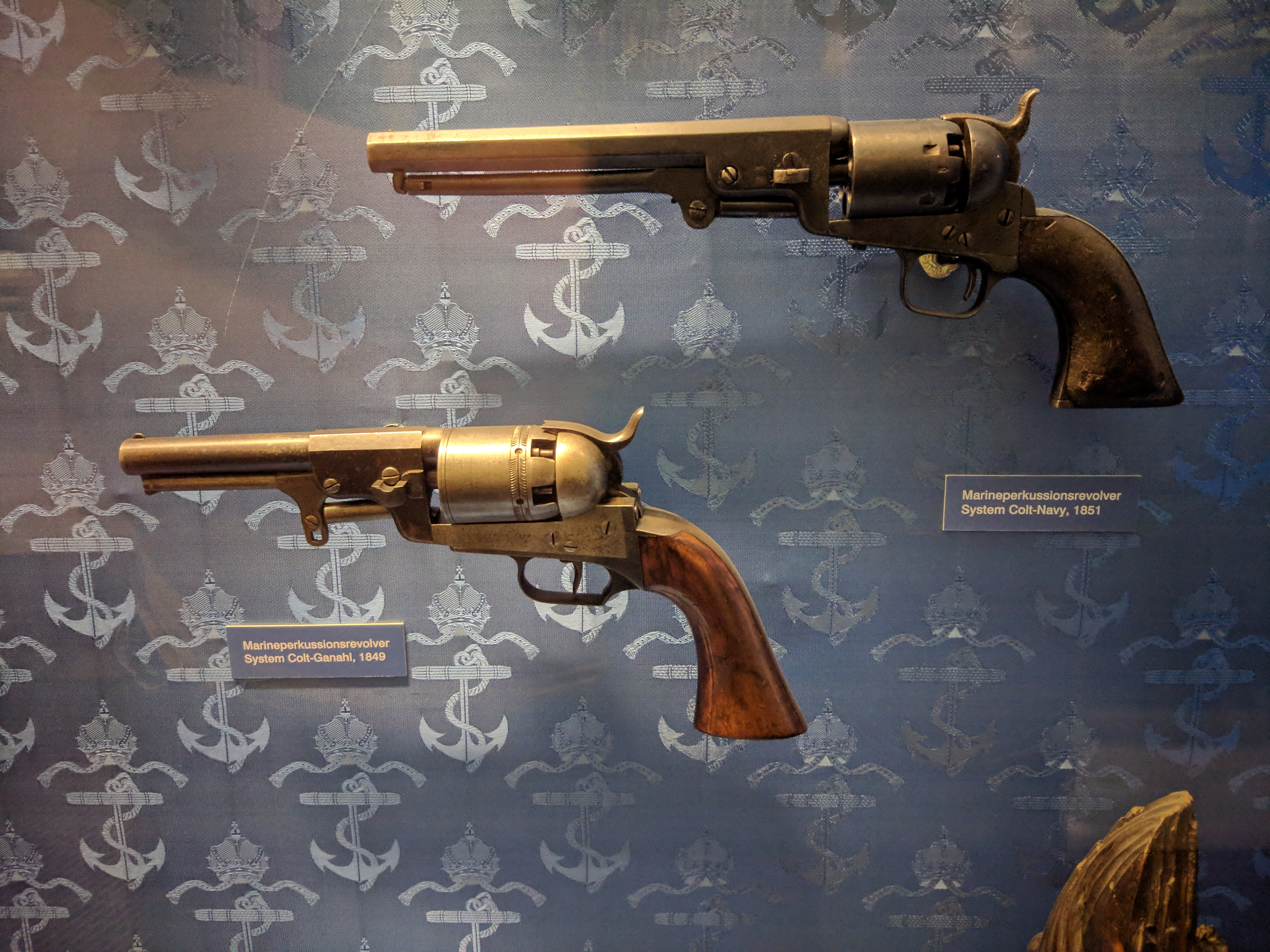
- Ganahl revolver (left) and Colt Navy revolver (right)
- Type: Revolver
- Place of origin: Austrian Empire

Service history
- In service: 1850
- Used by: Austrian Navy

Production history
- Designer: Josef Ganahl
- Designed: 1849
- Manufacturer: K. u. k. priv. Maschinen-Fabrik, Innsbruck
- Produced: c. 1849

Specifications
- Length: 285 mm (11.2 in)
- Barrel length: 135 mm (5.3 in)
- Caliber: 9 mm (0.35 in)
- Action: Single-action
- Feed system: Six-round cylinder
- Sights: Blade front sight Hammer notch rear sight

The Ganahl revolver was produced in Innsbruck under a license agreement with Samuel Colt in 1849. It was based on the Colt Dragoon and was manufactured by the K. k. Maschinenfabrik under Josef Ganahl. The revolver was intended for military use, particularly by Austrian naval officers, and was also sold on the civilian market. Approximately 1,000 examples were produced during the period of licensed manufacture.

The revolver was manufactured in Innsbruck by the K. u. k. priv. Maschinen-Fabrik. It was based on the Colt Dragoon and incorporated modifications for Austrian use, including a reduced 9 mm caliber. The weapon is associated particularly with the Austrian naval service during the mid-19th century.

== Design and development ==
The Ganahl revolver was developed in Austria as a local variant of the Colt Dragoon. The design dates to 1849 and incorporated modifications intended for Austrian use. The revolver was chambered for a 9 mm cartridge and used a six-round cylinder with a single-action mechanism.

== Production ==
The Ganahl revolver was manufactured in Innsbruck by the K. u. k. priv. Maschinen-Fabrik. Production began around 1849. The exact number of revolvers produced is not known.

== Service history ==
The Ganahl revolver entered service with the Austrian Navy in 1850. It was used by Austrian naval personnel during the period of the Austrian Empire.

== See also ==
- Colt Dragoon
- Colt revolver
- Revolver
- Austrian Empire
- Austrian Navy
