= Zoraki R1 =

- Type: Revolver
- Place of origin: Turkey

Production history
- Manufacturer: Atak Arms
- Unit cost: 2,690°°-4,190°°Kč, (about $130ºº-$205ºº USD) in Czech Republic, 2026 €90°°-€110°° in European Union.
- Produced: 2006-present
- Variants: 2.5" 4mm 4.5" 4mm 3" 6mm 4.5" 6mm 6" 6mm

Specifications
- Mass: 720 g (1.59 lb)-890 g (1.96 lb)
- Length: 185 mm (7.3 in)-275 mm (10.8 in)
- Barrel length: 63.5 mm (2.50 in)-152.4 mm (6.00 in)
- Cartridge: 4 mm Flobert Short; 6 mm Flobert Balle; 6 mm ME Flobert Court
- Action: Single Action / Double Action
- Feed system: 9 rounds cilynder
- Sights: Adjustable
- References: Prices and specs according to distribuitor in Czech Republic.

The Zoraki R1 is a single/double-action revolver manufactured by the Turkish company Atak Arms.

== Design and development ==
Atak Arms (Atak Silah) was founded in 2006 in Istanbul, Türkiye, initially dedicated to the manufacture of blank-firing guns.

The initial versions of the Zoraki R1 were blank-firing models, designed for 9mm P.A.K. cartridges (featuring a 6-round rotating cylinder) and 6mm Flobert K cartridges (featuring a 9-round rotating cylinder); subsequently, versions chambered in 4mm Flobert Short and 6mm Flobert were introduced to the market. These revolvers are manufactured using a combination of steel components and light alloys, the frame is made of zinc alloy and are available in blued, matte chrome, and bright chrome finishes. The rear sights are adjustable for both elevation and windage, and the 9-round cylinder features a Smith & Wesson-style star extractor that facilitates faster reloading. The 4mm caliber versions feature a smoothbore barrel, whereas the 6mm caliber versions feature a rifled barrel.

In chronograph tests, the 6-inch version achieved muzzle velocities of up to 101 m/s with an impact energy of 5.44 J using 6mm ME Flobert 1.05g ammunition, while using 6mm Flobert CB 1.15g ammunition, velocities of 154 m/s and an impact energy of 13.65 J were achieved. The 4.5-inch version in 4mm caliber was also tested, achieving 158 m/s with 7.7gn ammunition, obtaining an impact energy of 6.24 J. In all cases, Sellier and Bellot ammunition was used.

=== Specs ===
According to manufacturer

Model	Length	Barrel length	Weight
2.5" 4mm	185 mm (7.3 in)	63.5 mm (2.50 in)	720 g (25 oz)
4.5" 4mm	235 mm (9.3 in)	114.3 mm (4.50 in)	850 g (30 oz)
3" 6 mm	187 mm (7.4 in)	76.2 mm (3.00 in)	750 g (26 oz)
4.5" 6 mm	235 mm (9.3 in)	114.3 mm (4.50 in)	850 g (30 oz)
6" 6 mm	275 mm (10.8 in)	152.4 mm (6.00 in)	890 g (31 oz)
