= George Tranter (footballer, born 1915) =

English footballer

Personal information
- Full name: George Henry Tranter
- Date of birth: 11 September 1915
- Place of birth: Yardley, England
- Date of death: 28 September 1998 (aged 83)
- Place of death: Brighton, England
- Position: Centre half

Senior career*
Years	Team	Apps	(Gls)
- Jack Mould's Athletic
	Shirley Amateurs	0	(0)
- Birmingham
- Evesham Town
- Solihull Town
- Rover Works
1934–1947	West Bromwich Albion	16	(0)
1947–1950	Hereford United	27	(1)
- * Club domestic league appearances and goals

George Henry Tranter (11 September 1915 – 28 September 1998) was an English professional footballer who played as a centre half in the Football League for West Bromwich Albion. He later coached at Birmingham City.

== Personal life ==
Tranter's father George was also a footballer. After retiring from football, he became a publican.

== Career statistics ==
Appearances and goals by club, season and competition
Club	Season	League			FA Cup		Total	
Club	Season	Division	Apps	Goals	Apps	Goals	Apps	Goals
West Bromwich Albion	1945–46	—			4	0	4	0
West Bromwich Albion	1946–47	Second Division	16	0	0	0	16	0
West Bromwich Albion	Total		16	0	4	0	20	0
Hereford United	1947–48	Southern League	11	1	1	0	12	1
Hereford United	1948–49	Southern League	5	0	1	0	6	0
Hereford United	1949–50	Southern League	11	0	4	0	15	0
Hereford United	Total		27	1	6	0	33	1
Career total			43	1	10	0	53	1
