= Smith & Wesson Model 48 =

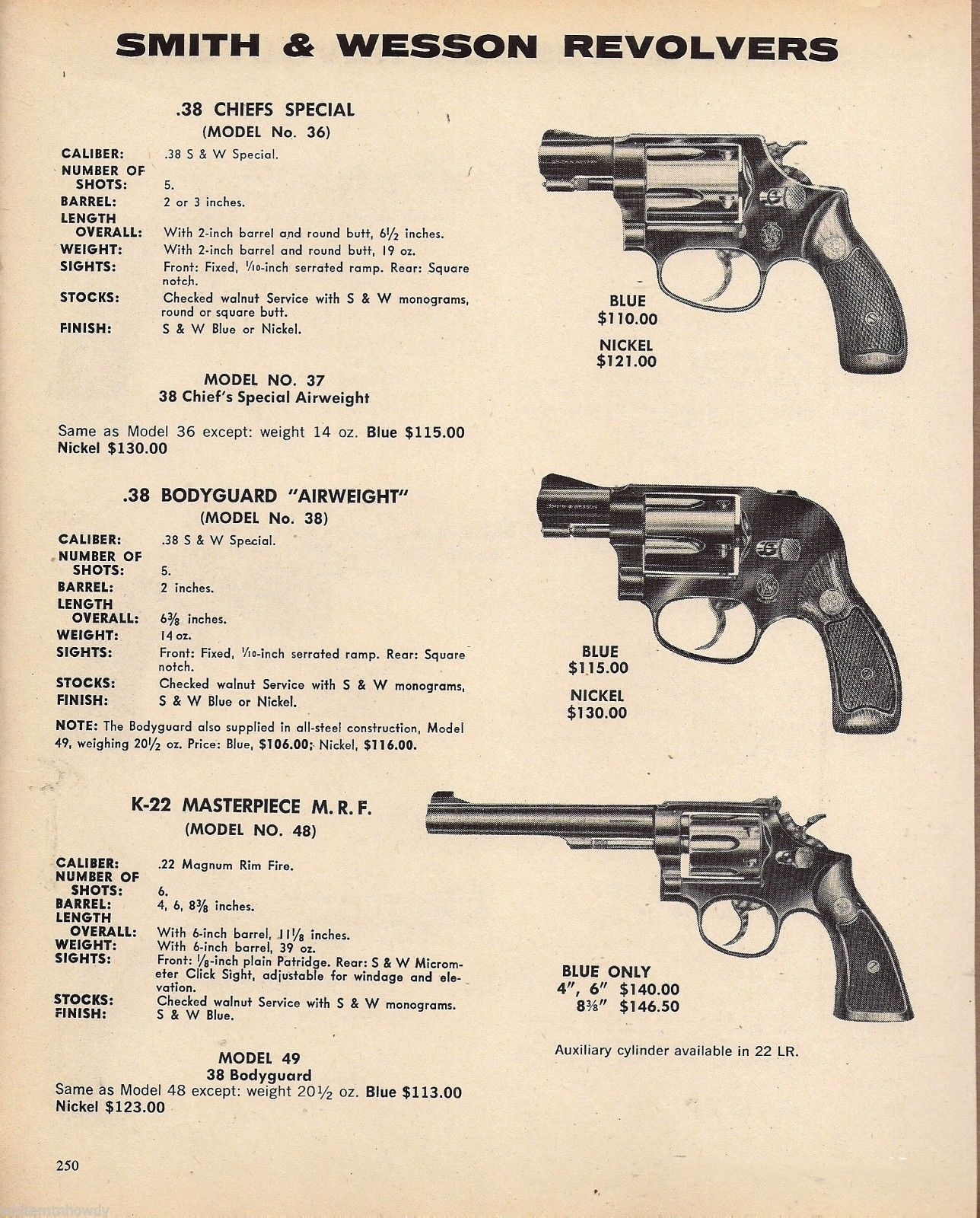
- The 1976 S&W catalog, detailing the Models 36, 38, and 48; the Model 48 is listed at the bottom
- Type: Revolver
- Place of origin: United States

Production history
- Designed: 1959
- Manufacturer: Smith & Wesson
- Produced: 1959–1986; 1989–present
- Variants: Model 648

Specifications
- Barrel length: 4 in (100 mm); 6 in (150 mm); 8 3/8 in (210 mm)
- Cartridge: .22 Winchester Magnum Rimfire
- Action: Double-action revolver
- Feed system: 6 round (Model 48 or earlier 648)

The Smith & Wesson K-22 M.R.F. Masterpiece Revolver (Model 48) is a six-shot, double-action revolver with adjustable open sights, built on the medium-size "K" frame. It is chambered for the .22 Winchester Magnum Rimfire cartridge, which was also introduced in 1959.

The Model 48 is based on the Smith & Wesson K-22 Target Masterpiece revolver (also known as the Model 17) chambered in .22 long rifle (the most notable difference is a .224-inch broach through the barrel instead of a .222-inch one used in .22 LR) cartridges. Most K-22 revolvers were fitted with a 4 in (100 mm), a 6 in (150 mm) or 8 3/8 in (210 mm) barrel, but other lengths have been produced.

First produced in 1959 as the K-22 M.R.F. Masterpiece, it was numbered the Model 48 in 1959 when all Smith & Wesson guns were given numerical model numbers. It is built on the same frame as the seminal Smith & Wesson Model 10 ("Military and Police") revolver.

== Derivatives ==
=== Model 648 ===
Smith & Wesson Model 648
- Type: Revolver
- Place of origin: United States

Production history
- Designed: 1959
- Manufacturer: Smith & Wesson
- Produced: 1989–1996; 2003–2005; 2019–present

Specifications
- Barrel length: 6 in (150 mm)
- Cartridge: .22 Winchester Magnum Rimfire
- Action: Double-action revolver
- Feed system: 6- or 8-round cylinder

The Smith & Wesson Model 648 is a double-action revolver that is chambered in .22 Winchester Magnum Rimfire. Released with a 6-round (later an 8-round) cylinder, it replaced the Model 48 (which as discontinued in 1986) in 1989. The Model 648 was discontinued by 1996, but was reintroduced in 2003; it was soon discontinued in 2005. Even though the Model 48 was reintroduced in 2010 as one of the “Classic” lines, the Model 648 was reintroduced in 2019.

== Present state ==
The Model 48 was discontinued in 1986, but in 2010 was reintroduced as the Model 48 "Masterpiece" due to a resurgence in the popularity of vintage Smith & Wesson revolvers. The company chose approximately fifteen previously discontinued models to produce once again. This was done under the "Classics" category of S&W's current offerings.

== See also ==
- List of firearms
