= George Tranter (footballer, born 1886) =

English footballer

George Henry Tranter (24 February 1886 – 18 October 1958) was a professional footballer who is best known for his time with Aston Villa. Before playing for Villa (1906–1918) Tranter played for Stourbridge. In Tony Matthews' book Who's Who of Aston Villa he was described as "as hard as nails, he never shirked a tackle, was totally committed, had an infallibly cool temperament and was a good passer of the ball, very rarely hoofing it downfield." Tranter had to retire due to injury.

== Personal life ==
Tranter's son George also became a footballer.
