= Garcia-Reynoso revolver =

- Type: Revolver
- Place of origin: Argentina

Specifications
- Cartridge: 7.8x30mm
- Barrels: 7.8mm
- Feed system: 10 rounds (5 in cylinder, 5 in magazine)

The Garcia-Reynoso was a revolver of Argentine origin, developed by captain Antonio García Reynoso. The weapon was chambered in the 7.8×30mm Reynoso round and featured automatic ejection.

The design was then acquired from Leige and further developed by Henri Pieper. Pieper then obtained a German patent, number 81930 of 27 May 1894.
