= 10.6×25mmR =

Pistol cartridge

10.6×25mmR German Ordnance
- Type: Pistol
- Place of origin: German Empire

Service history
- In service: 1879-1945
- Used by: German Empire
- Wars: German colonial conflicts, Boxer Rebellion, World War I, World War II

Production history
- Designed: Exact date of development is uncertain. Sometime between German unification (following the Franco-Prussian War of 1870–71), and formal adoption of the Reichsrevolver in 1879.

Specifications
- Parent case: Believed to be a development of the .44 Russian
- Case type: Rimmed, straight case
- Bullet diameter: 10.92 mm (0.430 in)
- Shoulder diameter: 11.5 mm (0.45 in)
- Base diameter: 11.53 mm (0.454 in)
- Rim diameter: 12.94 mm (0.509 in)
- Case length: 24.64 mm (0.970 in)
- Overall length: 36.82 mm (1.450 in)

Ballistic performance
Bullet mass/type	Velocity	Energy
262 gr (17 g) LRN	705 ft/s (215 m/s)	298 ft⋅lbf (404 J)
- Source: "Cartridges of the World"

The 10.6×25mmR German Ordnance cartridge, also called the 10.6mm Reichsrevolver, the 10.6mm Service Ordnance, or the 10.55mm German cartridge, is a pistol cartridge designed by the then newly formed German Empire for their first two official service revolvers the M1879 & M1883 Reichsrevolvers.

It is believed to have been influenced by, or developed from the .44 Russian cartridge, which had been developed by the American firearms manufacturer Smith & Wesson for the Armies of Imperial Russia.

== History ==
When they were adopted by Imperial Germany, both the 10.6×25mmR German Ordnance cartridge and the Reichsrevolver had already been surpassed by more advanced developments already in use by other nations and empires of Europe and the Americas. The 10.6×25mm German Ordnance cartridge would be slowly phased out and replaced in German service by the modern 9×19mm Parabellum round with the adoption of the Pistole Parabellum 1908 (more commonly called the Luger pistol) in 1908, and would be used alongside its successor, the 9×19mm Parabellum, in World War I, and would see minimal use through the period of World War II, before finally being completely phased out.

== See also ==
- List of rimmed cartridges
