= MP-412 REX =

- Type: Revolver
- Place of origin: Russia

Production history
- Designed: 1993
- Manufacturer: Izhevsk Mechanical Plant

Specifications
- Mass: 0.9 kg (2.0 lb) (unloaded)
- Length: 232 mm (9.1 in) (4 in barrel); 282 mm (11.1 in) (6 in barrel)
- Barrel length: 102 mm (4.0 in); 152 mm (6.0 in)
- Cartridge: .357 Magnum.38 Special
- Action: Double-action/single-action
- Feed system: 6-round cylinder
- Sights: Iron sights

The MP-412 REX (Revolver for Export; Russian: MP-412 РЕКС) is a Russian double-action/single-action revolver designed by the state-owned Izhevsk Mechanical Plant (IZHMEKH), with a top break-action cylinder and an automatic ejector, chambered for the .357 Magnum and .38 Special cartridges.

== History ==
The MP-412 was designed in the 1990s, and intended for export. However, it never entered production; it is unclear why this was, though it was likely due to its largest potential market, the United States, being closed, because of an agreement between U.S. president Bill Clinton and Russian president Boris Yeltsin in the 1990s, voluntarily banning the import of firearms from Russia to the United States.

== Design and features ==
The MP-412 is unusual in that it has a top-break cylinder design, rather than the more common swing-out cylinder design found on most modern double-action revolvers. It also features a composite lower frame, consisting of steel with a polymer grip.

== See also ==
- List of modern Russian small arms and light weapons
