= OTs-20 Gnom =

- Type: Revolver
- Place of origin: Russia

Service history
- In service: MVD

Production history
- Designer: TsKIB SOO
- Manufacturer: KBP Instrument Design Bureau
- Produced: 1994
- No. built: 200

Specifications
- Mass: 1.1 kg (1.17 with ammo)
- Length: 250 mm
- Barrel length: 100 mm (3.93 inches)
- Width: 45 mm
- Height: 132 mm
- Cartridge: 12.5x40mm STs-110
- Action: Double action or single action
- Muzzle velocity: 350–400 m/s (lethal ammunition); 100 m/s (non-lethal ammunition)
- Feed system: 5-round cylinder
- Sights: Fixed; front blade and rear notch

The OTs-20 Gnom (ОЦ-20 "Гном") is a Russian revolver manufactured by the KBP Instrument Design Bureau. It uses a proprietary 12.5x40mm STs-110 cartridge developed from a 32 gauge shotgun cartridge. It can fire lead slug (STs-110-04), lead shot (STs-110-02), and armor-piercing steel-core slug (STs-110) cartridges, as well as three types of non-lethal ammunition. The revolver is smooth bore and so it lacks accuracy but has high muzzle velocity and stopping power.

A tactical laser projector is available that mounts on an accessory rail under the ejector rod shroud. It is turned on and off via a pressure switch that can be attached on the grip; the operator just squeezes the grip and the projector goes on or off.

The manufacturer claims that the steel-core slug can penetrate 4.5 mm of "standard body armor plate" at 25 m. They also claim that the dispersion of this bullet at this distance is about 5 cm.

== Development ==
The gun was designed by A.N. Nevizhin (А.Н. Невижин), V.I. Seregin (В.И. Серёгин) and S.V. Zotov (С.В. Зотов) at TsKIB SOO. Its production started in 1994, and only 200 pieces have been known to be made as of 2013. The gun was partially derived from the 9 mm OTs-11 Nickel revolver previously developed by Nevizhin and Zotov.

== Similar Weapons ==
Before the Gnom, the MVD had already in service a similar item: the KBP 12.3mm UDAR revolver. Derived from the 9mm R-92 revolver, the UDAR was designed to be used as a self-defense and riot-control weapon for undercover or plainclothes police. It uses rounds derived from cut-down 36-gauge shotgun shells and can fire shot, slug or aerosol gas shells.

== See also ==
- List of Russian weaponry
