= Udar revolver =

UDAR (УДАР)
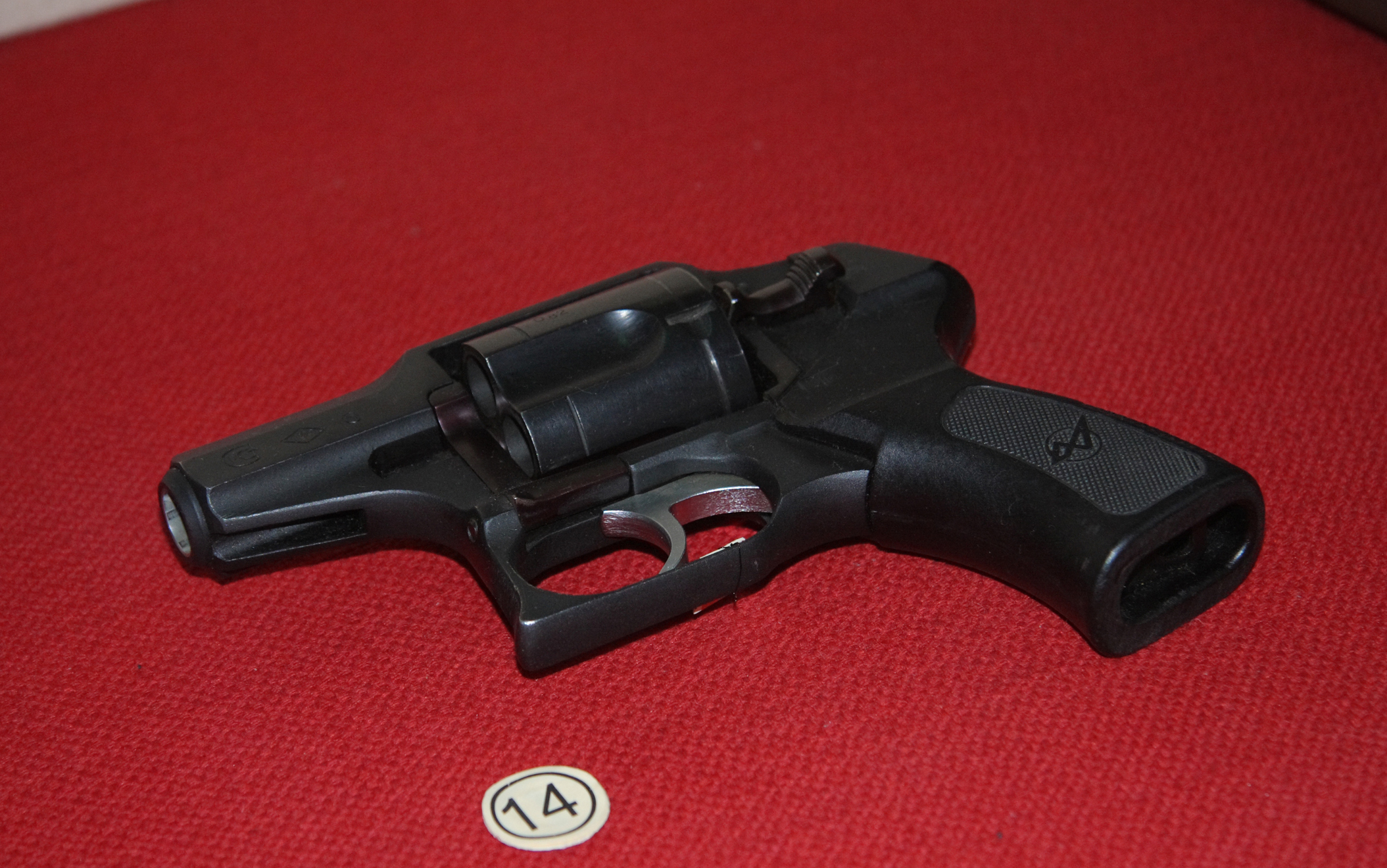
- Type: Revolver
- Place of origin: Russia

Service history
- In service: MVD

Production history
- Designer: KBP Instrument Design Bureau
- Designed: 1994
- Manufacturer: KBP Instrument Design Bureau
- Variants: Udar-S, Udar-TS

Specifications
- Mass: 920 g empty
- Length: 173 mm
- Width: 44 mm
- Height: 134 mm
- Cartridge: 12.3x50mmR (UDAR); 12.3x40mmR (UDAR-TS); 12.3x22mmR PM32 (UDAR-S); 9x18mm Makarov, 9x17mm Short (R-92)
- Action: Double action
- Effective firing range: 5 m (Gas- or Liquid-Projection), 10 m (Plastic Baton), 25 m (Bullet)
- Feed system: 5-round cylinder

The U-94 UDAR (У-94 "Удар"; the Russian word udar means "Strike" or "Blow") is a police weapon designed and developed by the KBP Instrument Design Bureau in the early 1990s and first manufactured in 1994. It is a compact double-action revolver that chambers proprietary ammunition in the form of an unusual 12.3mm (0.484" caliber, or 41-gauge) shell. It has a shrouded hammer that can be manually cocked or decocked by use of a cut-out slot at the top of the shroud. It has a side-breaking cylinder that opens to the left and uses a star-ejector to eject all the spent shells at once.

== Design ==
It was originally designed to fire tear gas (CS) aerosol, rubber baton, and rubber buckshot for self-protection or less-than-lethal crowd control. However, it also has jacketed hollow-point and armor-piercing slug shells for self-defense against armed opponents and is reported to take lead shot shells as well.

The weapon has three different-sized cylinders (12.3x22mmR, 12.3x40mmR, and 12.3x50mmR). The bore has been alternately described as 12.5 mm (0.492" caliber), 12.7 mm (.50" caliber), 32-gauge (0.526" caliber [13.36 mm]) or 36-gauge (0.506" caliber [12.85 mm]). All ammunition was made by the Tula Cartridge Works (Tulskiy Patronniy Zavod) and was imprinted with either its civilian ("TPZ") or military ("539") headstamp code.

== Adoption ==
The design has met with relatively little success to date and failed to catch on with Russian police in the 1990s. They, like the police in most European nations, were used to using semi-automatic pistols rather than revolvers and preferred their larger magazines and quicker reloading times. The need to unload and reload the cylinder and discard partially spent mags when changing ammo types in a crisis situation also made it impractical, it was believed. It has been adopted in some numbers by the MVD though.

== Variants ==
- Its design was based on the R-92 compact revolver chambered in 9x18mm Makarov for sale to police. A variant (R-92S) was made in 9x17mm Short for use by private security officers and bodyguards.
- The Udar-S ("Service") U94S [12.3x22mmR PM-32] is designed as a conventional revolver for use by private security, bodyguards, or security-conscious VIPs. It only fires lead slug rounds, but the Armor-Piercing shell is not commercially available.
- The Udar-TS ("Training Service") or U94TS [12.3x40mm] fires paint-filled bullets for training purposes. It can also be used for crowd control to fire dye or musk rounds to mark rioters for later arrest.

== Similar designs ==
- TsNIITochMash (Central Scientific-Research Institute of Precise Mechanical Engineering) made its own version of the UDAR. It weighs 950g empty, has a longer barrel (210mm overall), is available in either single- or double-action, has an exposed hammer, and is loaded using a two-part interlocking 5-round "full moon" clip. Available shells include lead slug, armor-piercing core slug, blank, pepper spray, marking dye, and rubber baton.
- AKBP (Агентство Коммерческой Безопасности Специзделия, "Commercial Security Bureau for Special Products") markets the Ratnik ("Warrior") [13x45mm], which fires blanks, duplex rubber shot (two 13mm rubber balls), or tear-gas aerosol shells. The Ratnik 410x45TK [.410-bore 1.77" (10.4x45mm)] is a smaller-bore self-defense version based on a .410-bore shotgun shell. It only fires rubber bullets.
- The KBP OTs-20 Gnom ("Gnome") [12.5x40mm] is a conventional large-frame revolver designed to fire cut-down 32-gauge full-brass shotgun shells. It fires the STs110 armor-piercing-core lead slug, STs110-04 hollow-point lead slug, and STs110-02 lead shot cartridges.

== See also ==
- List of Russian weaponry
