= Gward revolver =

Gward
- Type: Revolver
- Place of origin: Poland

Service history
- In service: Polish police

Production history
- Designer: Wojskowa Akademia Techniczna (WAT)
- Designed: 1990-1991
- Manufacturer: KMW "Wifama"
- Produced: 1993-1997
- Variants: Rg

Specifications
- Mass: 1,000 g (35 oz) (short barrel); 1,200 g (42 oz) (long barrel); 900 g (32 oz) (Rg)
- Length: 197 mm (7.8 in) (short barrel, Rg); 235 mm (9.3 in) (long barrel)
- Barrel length: 63.5 mm (2.50 in) (short barrel, Rg); 101.6 mm (4.00 in) (long barrel)
- Width: 37 mm (1.5 in)
- Height: 136 mm (5.4 in)
- Cartridge: .38 Special (9x29mmR)
- Action: Double action
- Effective firing range: Sights ranged for 25 m
- Feed system: 6-round cylinder
- Sights: Rear notch, front blade, 110 mm (4.3 in) sight radius (short barrel version and Rg), 150 mm (5.9 in) sight radius (long barrel)

The Gward is the name of a series of .38-caliber Polish revolvers designed by engineers from the state-run Wojskowa Akademia Techniczna (H. Głowicki, W. Koperski, S. Ciepielski) and Kombinat Maszyn Włókienniczych "Wifama" factory (R. Chełmicki, T. Podgórski, J. Dudek) for the Polish Ministry of Internal Affairs.

A pre production trial series of Gward revolvers were manufactured in 1992. Series production of the Guard revolver was never launched due to financial problems of the "Wifama" factory.
