= Smith & Wesson Model 386 =

- Type: Revolver
- Place of origin: United States

Production history
- Manufacturer: Smith & Wesson
- Unit cost: $1,011

Specifications
- Mass: 0.69 kg (24 oz)
- Length: 190 mm (7.5 in)
- Barrel length: 64 mm (2.5 in)
- Caliber: .357 Magnum.38 Special
- Action: Double-Action/Single-Action
- Sights: XS Sight Systems Big Dot front, C&S fixed U-notch rear

The Smith & Wesson Model 386 was a Revolver that could fire .38 Special or .357 Magnum. it was designed to be an Ideal-Carry Revolver
