= M1879 Reichsrevolver =

Reichsrevolver Model M79
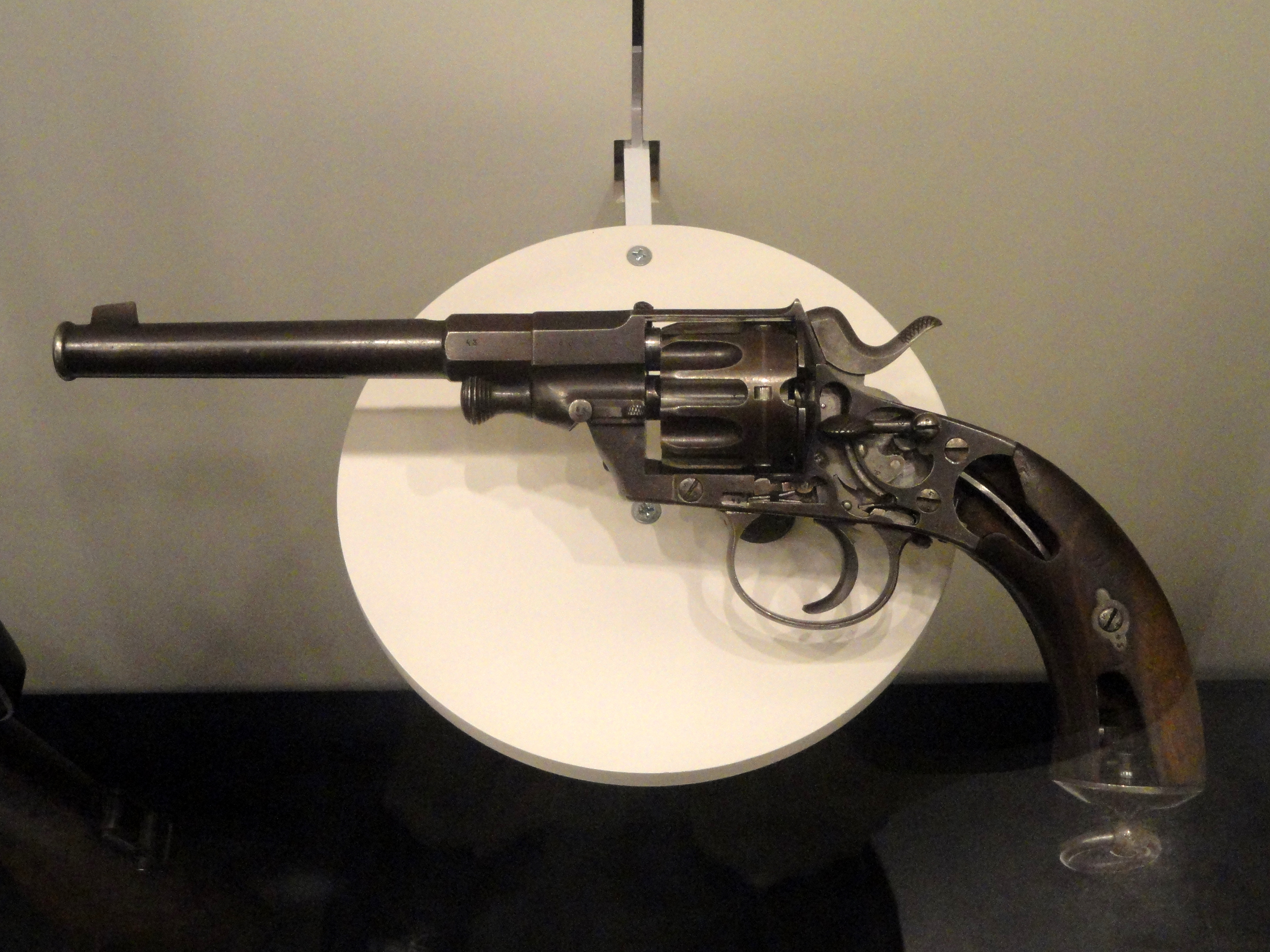
- M1879 German Trooper's Revolver
- Type: Revolver
- Place of origin: German Empire

Service history
- In service: 1879 – 1945
- Used by: German Empire
- Wars: German colonial conflicts, Boer Wars, Boxer Rebellion, World War I, World War II

Production history
- Manufacturer: V.C. Schilling & Cie Spangenberg & Sauer C.G. Haenel; Mauser; Königliche Gewehrfabrik Erfurt
- Produced: 1879-1908
- No. built: about 450,000 (M1879 and M1883 combined)
- Variants: M1883 (5 in barrel)

Specifications
- Mass: 1.3 kg (2.9 lb) (M1879); 0.9 kg (2.0 lb) (M1883)
- Length: 345 mm (13.6 in) (M1879); 225 mm (8.9 in) (M1883)
- Barrel length: 181 mm (7.1 in) (M1879); 117 mm (4.6 in) (M1883)
- Cartridge: 10.6×25mmR
- Caliber: 10.6 mm (.41 in)
- Action: Single action
- Muzzle velocity: 670 ft/s (200 m/s)
- Feed system: 6-round cylinder

The M1879 Reichsrevolver, or Reichs-Commissions-Revolver Modell 1879 and 1883, were service revolvers used by the German Army from 1879 to 1908, when it was superseded by the Luger.

The two versions of the revolver differ in barrel length (The M1883 had a 5-inch barrel) and grip shape. Although the design was dated, the weapon was extremely robust, and they were still used through World War I and until 1945 by the security of the customs administration. The M1879 is referred to as the "cavalry model" and the M1883 as the "officer's model," by collectors, which were not official designations.

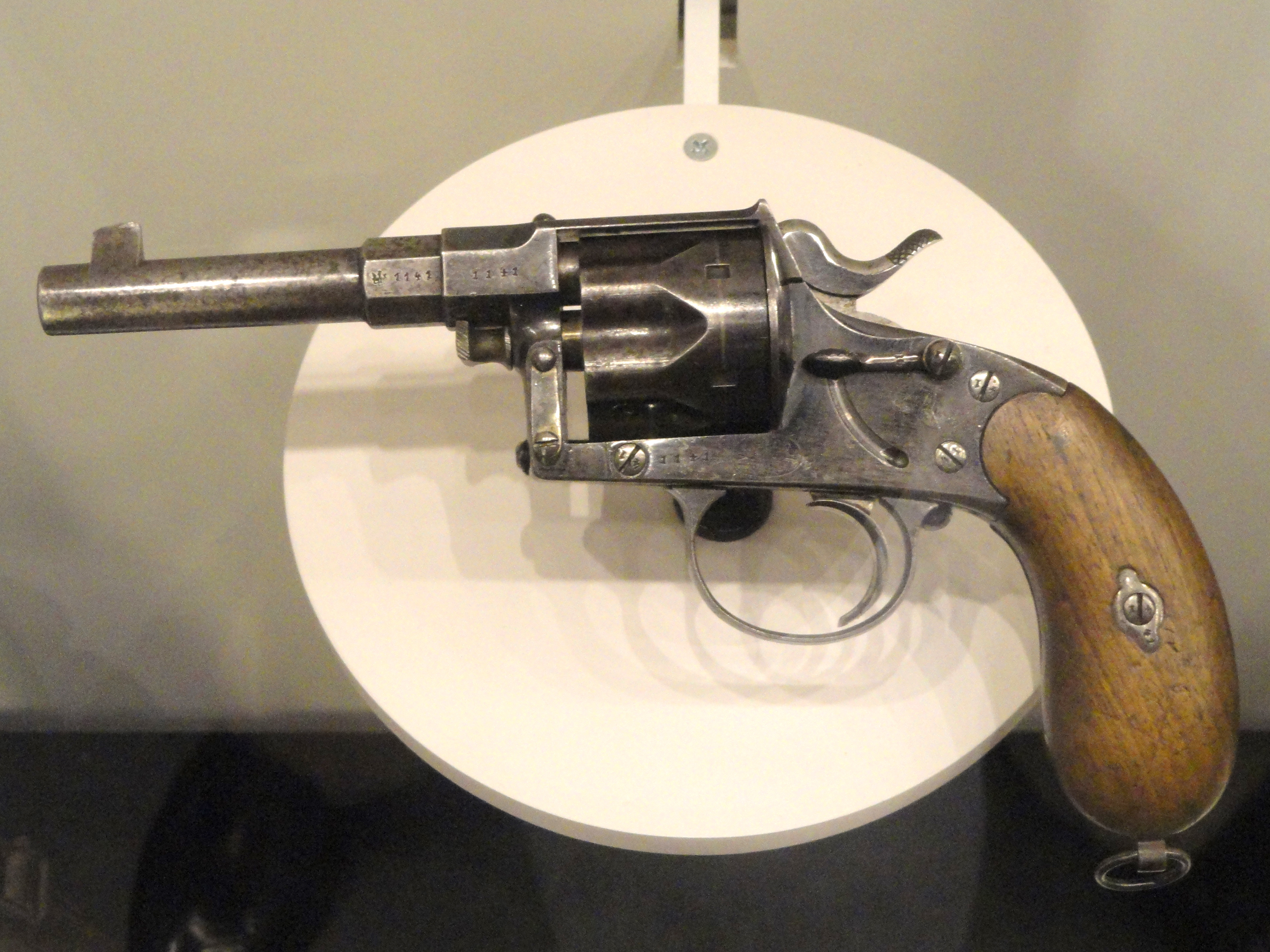
Model 1883 Reichsrevolver

== Design ==
Both models were single-action, solid frame, non-ejecting six-shot revolvers. The caliber was an indigenous 10.6×25mmR with a medium-length cartridge case, comparable to the contemporary .44 Russian round in size and power. Loading was via a gate on the revolver's right side, and the cylinder was released by pulling the hammer to half-cock. Removing empty cartridges could be done by removing the cylinder by withdrawing the axis pin, and then removing the casings by hand, but in actual practice a separate small rod (stored in the ammunition pouch) was used to push the casings out without having to remove the cylinder. A unique feature among these revolvers was the safety lever, which was often applied with the hammer resting in the half-cock position.

Most revolvers came with a lanyard ring for attachment to the uniform.

== See also ==
- Mauser Zig-Zag

== Literature ==
- Zhuk, A.B. (1995). Walter, John (ed.). The illustrated encyclopedia of HANDGUNS, pistols and revolvers of the world, 1870 to 1995. Translated by Bobrov, N.N. London: Greenhill Books. ISBN 1-85367-187-8.
- Kinard, Jeff (2003). Pistols, An Illustrated History of Their Impact. Santa Barbara, California: ABC-CLIO, Inc. ISBN 1-85109-475-X.
- Military Small Arms of the Twentieth Century, 7th Edition, Weeks, John, Hogg, Ian V.
