= Revolver 1882, 1882/1929 =

Revolver M1882
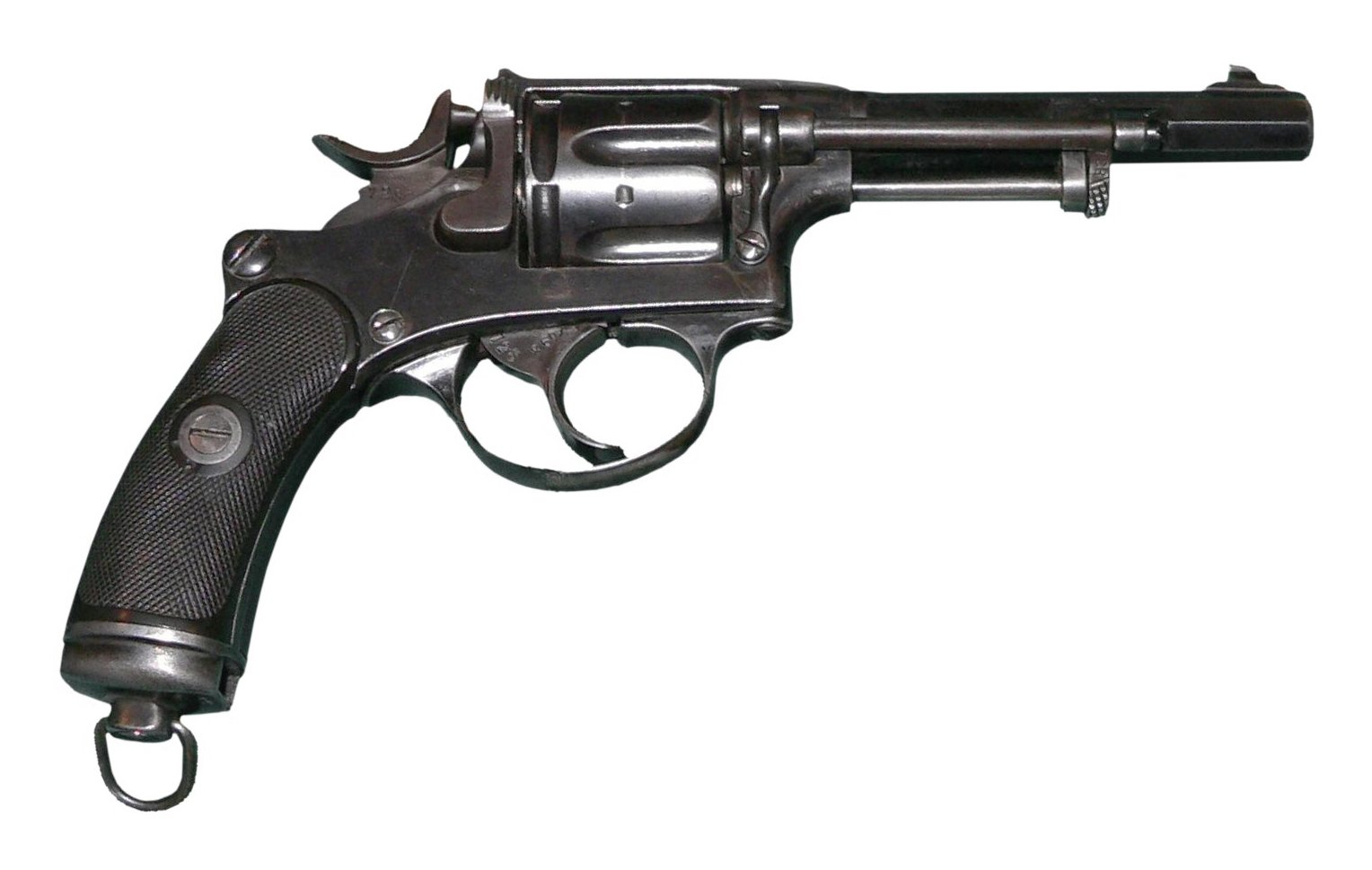
- Type: Service Revolver
- Place of origin: Switzerland

Service history
- In service: 1882-1949
- Used by: Swiss Army

Production history
- Designer: Rudolph Schmidt
- Manufacturer: Waffenfabrik Bern
- Produced: 1882-1929
- Variants: Model 1929

Specifications
- Mass: 0.8 kg
- Length: 235 mm
- Barrel length: 114 mm
- Cartridge: 7.5mm 1882 Ordnance
- Caliber: 7.5 mm
- Action: Double Action Revolver
- Muzzle velocity: 690 ft/s (210 m/s)
- Effective firing range: 40 m
- Feed system: Six round cylinder
- Sights: Bead front sight, U-notch rear sight

The Revolver M1882, also referred to by the name Model 1929, was a revolver produced in Switzerland by the Waffenfabrik Bern and which was used as an ordnance arm by the Swiss Army.

== Design ==
It was designed by Swiss Army Colonel Rudolph Schmidt The revolver was designed to use the black powder 7.5 millimeter round. The 1882 was a simple and effective design. Model 1882 with serial numbers under 20,000 were fitted with vulcanized rubber grips. Model with serial numbers over 20,000 had wood grips. Some were made by SIG.

details
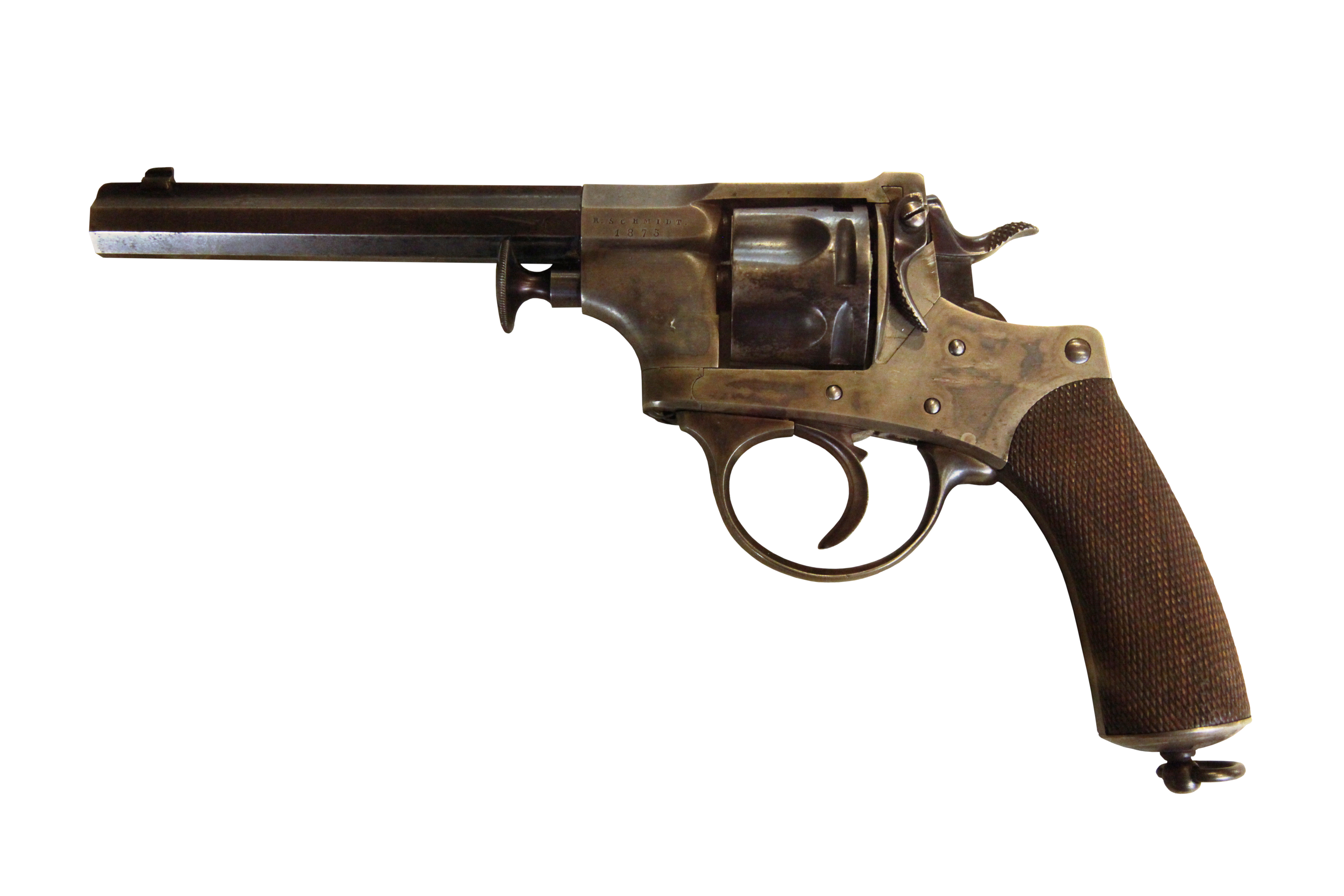
Revolver Schmidt-Rubin, trial model n°4, 1875

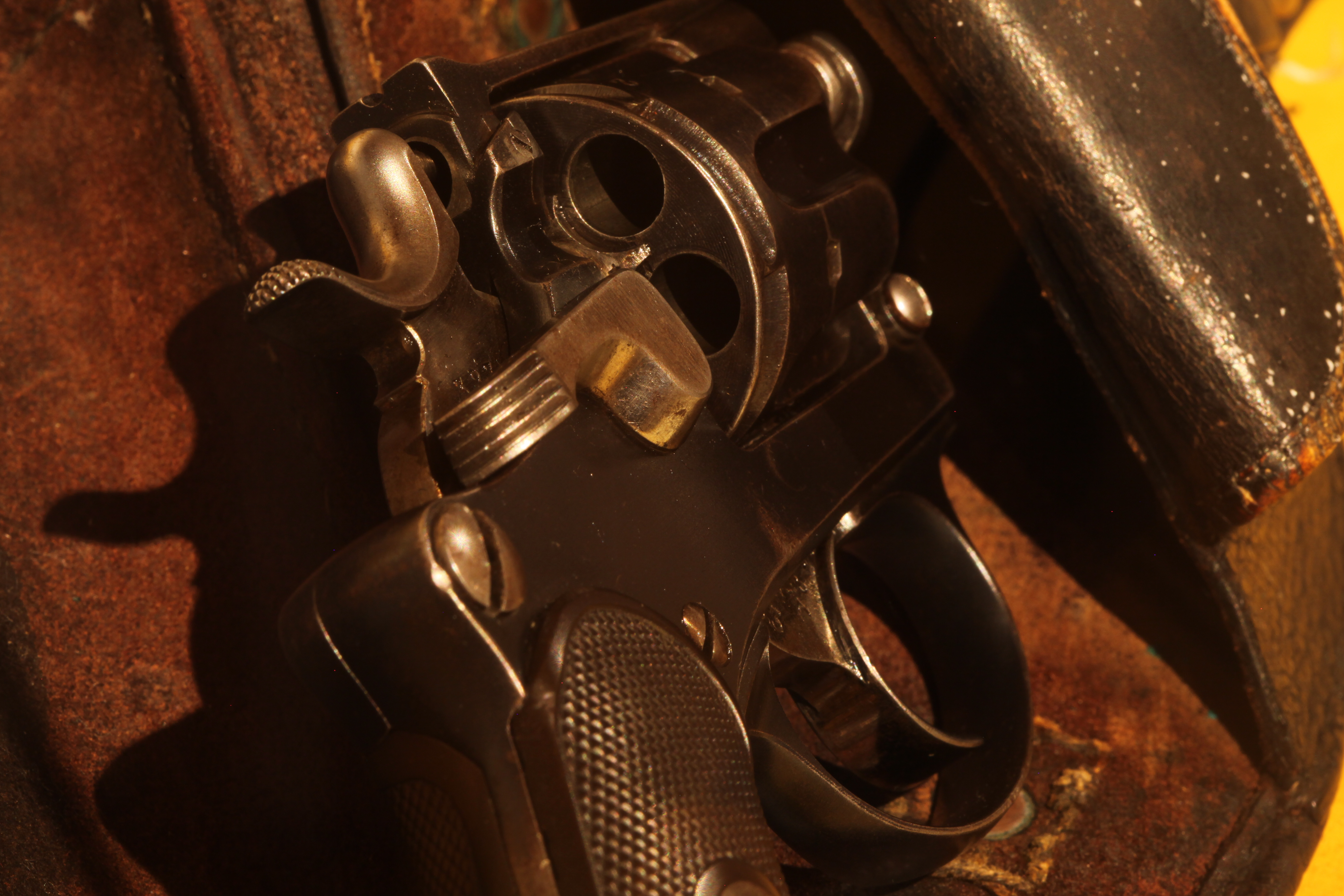
Loading bay

== The Model 1929 ==
Model 1929
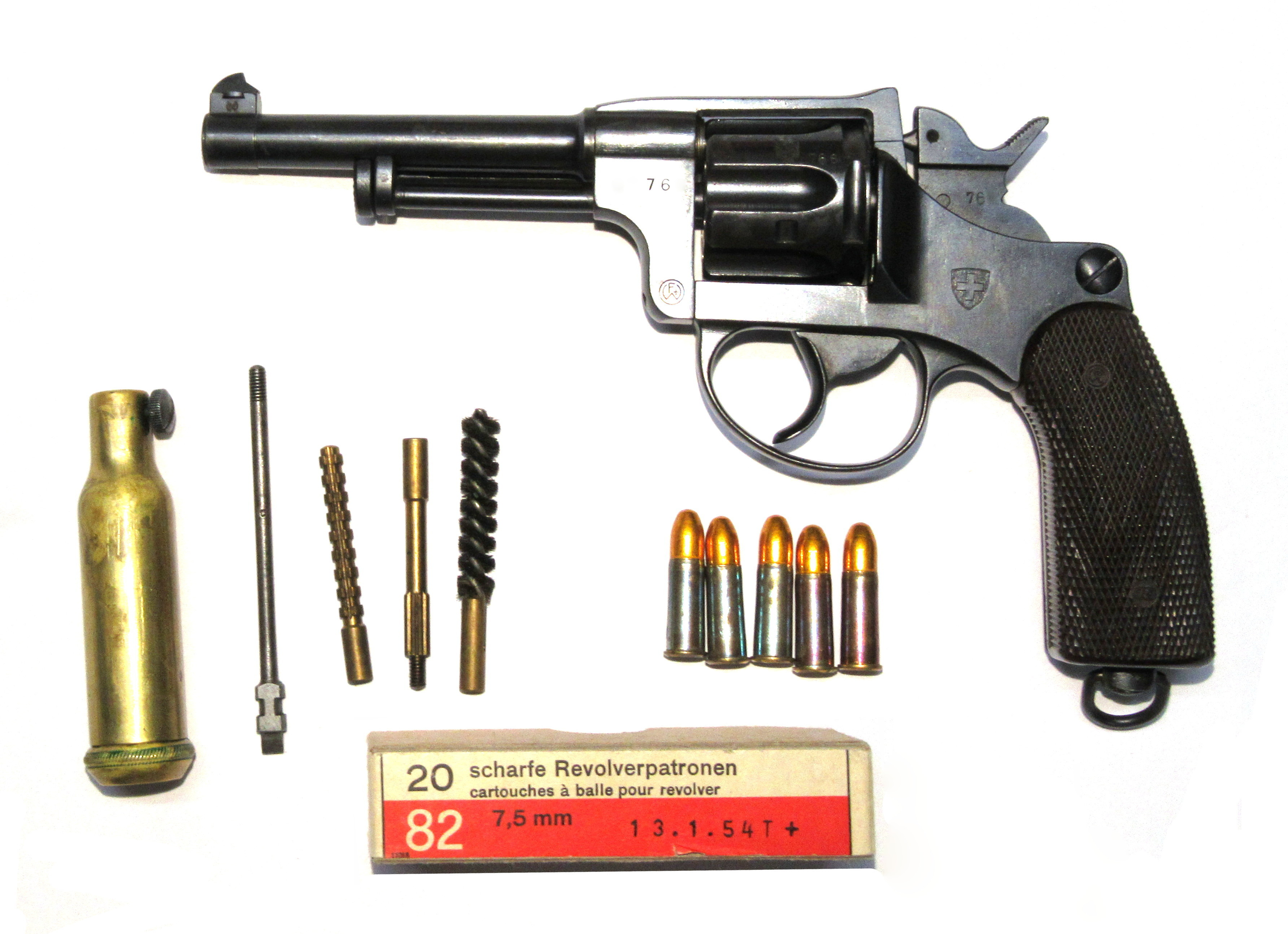
- Revolver Model 1929 with cleaning kit and ammunition

Production history
- Produced: 1929–1946

Specifications
- Mass: 0.8 kg
- Length: 228 mm
- Barrel length: 116 mm

The model 1929, or "M1882-29", is a more simplified version of the model 1882. Most changes were made to help ease production and to make it less expensive. One can distinguish a model 1929 by its round barrel from the 1882's octagonal one. Grip was widened to make it more ergonomical and higher quality steel was used. The upper frame was made more rigid and a firing pin instead of the older models one-piece hammer was used. The 1929 continued to use black powder cartridges in Swiss military service and was finally removed from service in the 1970s.
