= Zastava M83 =

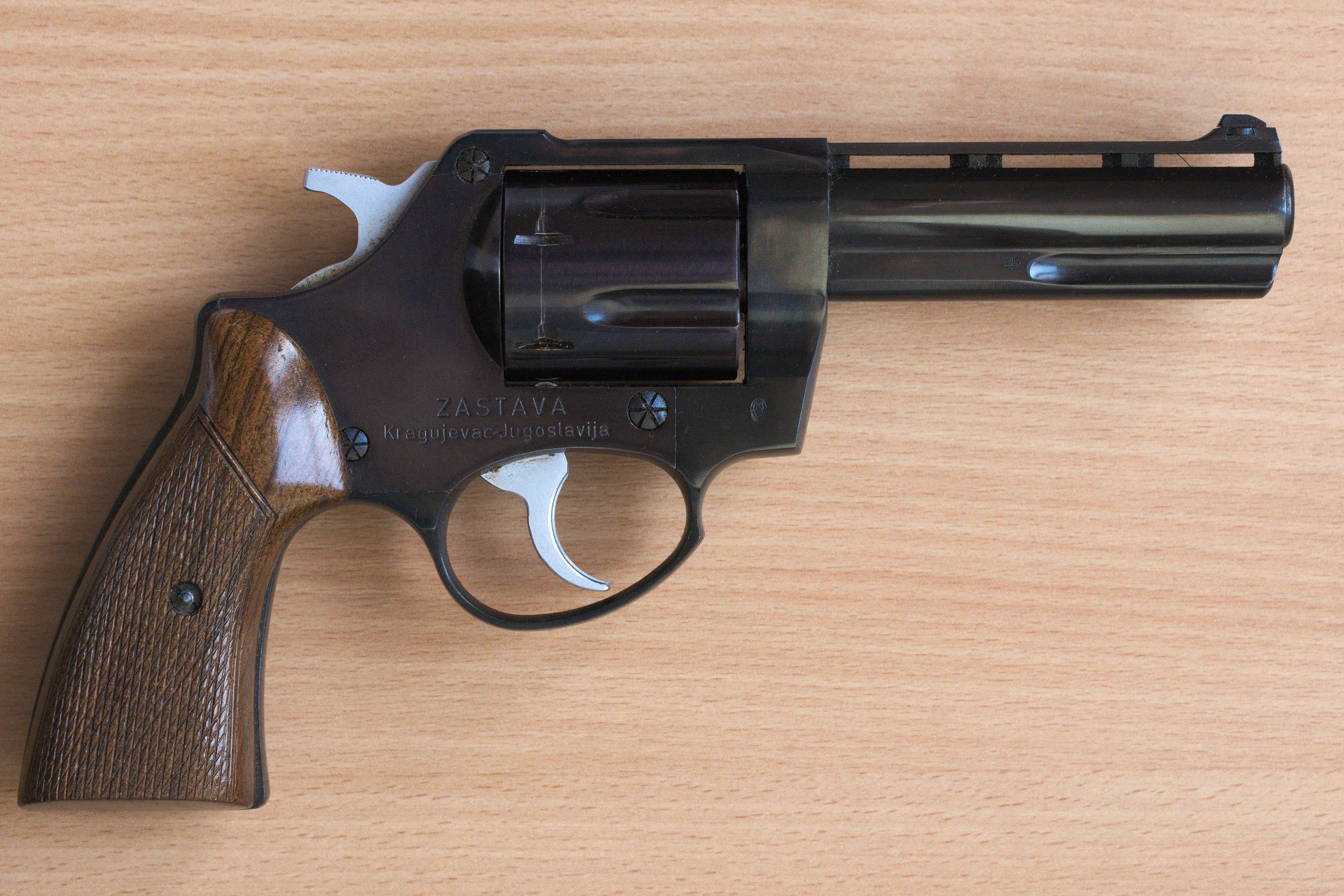
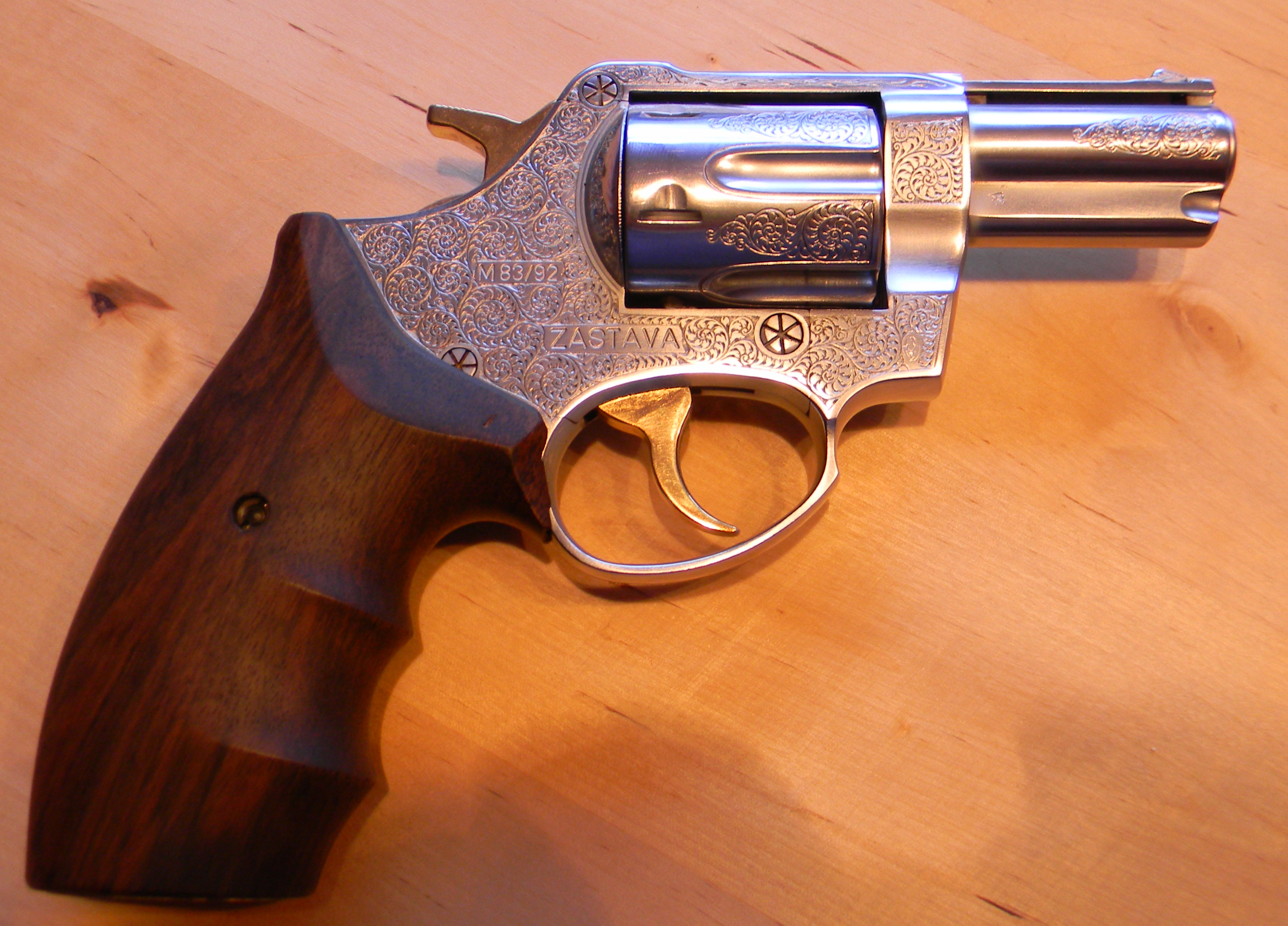
- Type: Revolver
- Place of origin: Yugoslavia

Production history
- Manufacturer: Zavodi Crvena Zastava
- Produced: 1983-1990s

Specifications
- Mass: 900 g (2.0 lb)
- Length: 188 mm (7.4 in)
- Barrel length: 64 mm (2.5 in)
- Cartridge: .357 Magnum
- Action: Double Action
- Feed system: 6 rounds cilinder
- Sights: Fixed
- References: Ian Hogg

The Zastava M83, also called Zastava R357, is a double-action revolver produced between 1983 and the 1990s by the Yugoslav company Voini Techniki Zavod, which was later renamed Zavodi Crvena Zastava.

== Design and development ==
The design of the M83 stemmed from the need to equip police forces with revolvers, given their well-known advantages over semi-automatic pistols; furthermore, at the time, many Western police and military forces were already equipped with modern revolver models. The M83 was manufactured entirely from steel, and its design was inspired by the Smith & Wesson K-frame (medium-frame) series as well as the Röhm RG-38S.

Designed to fire the .357 Magnum cartridge (allowing for the use of .38 Special as well), it also featured cylinder adapters for 9mm Parabellum. It was manufactured with 2.5-inch 3-inch 4-inch and 6-inch barrel lengths. The trigger requires a pull weight of 12 to 15 pounds; as a safety measure, the weapon incorporates a transfer bar safety and a spring-loaded firing pin. The rear sight is fixed and consists of a notch paired with a blade front sight, complemented by longitudinal anti-glare serrations along the top of the barrel. The cylinder swings out to the left, where a "window" is also located, allowing the user to verify whether the weapon is loaded.
