= 7.5mm 1882 Ordnance =

Center-fire revolver cartridge

- Type: Pistol
- Place of origin: Belgium

Service history
- In service: Switzerland and Sweden
- Used by: 1882-1903 (Switzerland) 1887-1903 (Sweden)

Production history
- Designer: Rudolf Schmidt (Colonel)
- Designed: 1880

Specifications
- Case type: Rimmed, straight
- Bullet diameter: 8.00 mm (0.315 in) (Swiss), 8.30 mm (0.327 in) (Swedish)
- Neck diameter: 8.40 mm (0.331 in)
- Base diameter: 8.40 mm (0.331 in)
- Rim diameter: 10.40 mm (0.409 in)
- Rim thickness: 1.50 mm (0.059 in)
- Case length: 22.80 mm (0.898 in)
- Overall length: 34.60 mm (1.362 in)
- Rifling twist: 1 turn in 350 mm (14 in)
- Primer type: small pistol
- Maximum pressure: 185 MPa (26,800 psi)

Ballistic performance
Bullet mass/type	Velocity	Energy
104 gr (7 g) FMJ	220 m/s (720 ft/s)	166.8 J (123.0 ft⋅lbf)
- Test barrel length: 15 cm (5.9 in); Source(s): Ammo Encyclopedia, 2nd Edition, Page 690, Michael Brussard

The Swiss 7.5mm center-fire revolver cartridge, also known as 7.5x23mmR, was used militarily in the 1882 and 1882/1929 revolvers of the Swiss army, as well as in Swiss civilian revolvers of the 'bulldog' type. The case is of brass; the heeled bullet is of a hard lead alloy, fully jacketed and coated externally with a wax lubricant. Originally it was loaded with 0.7 grams (11 gr) of black powder.

Similar revolver cartridges were used in the late 19th century military revolvers adopted by the armies of Belgium, Luxembourg, Sweden, Norway, and Serbia.
