= Colt Officer's Model (revolver) =

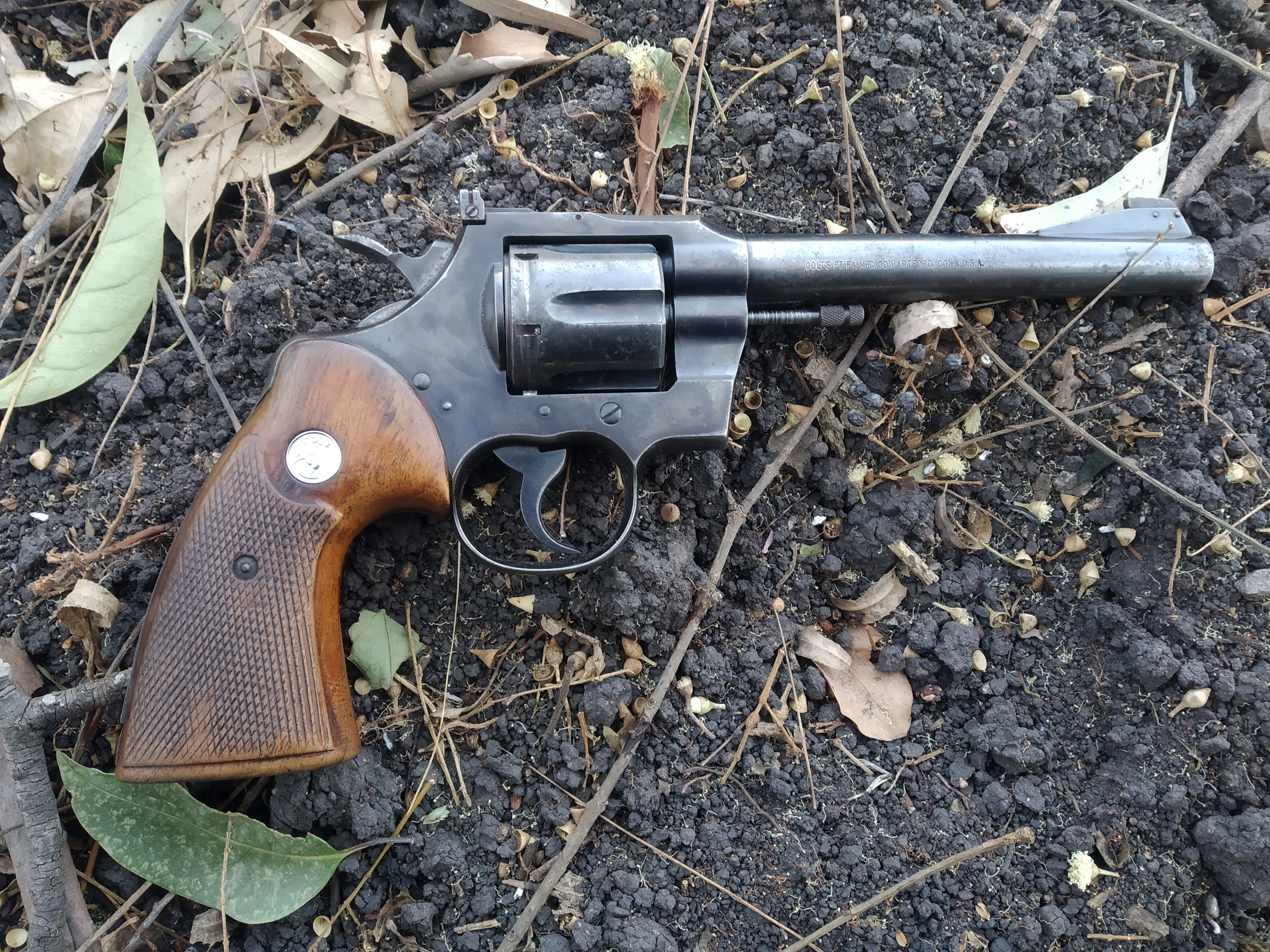
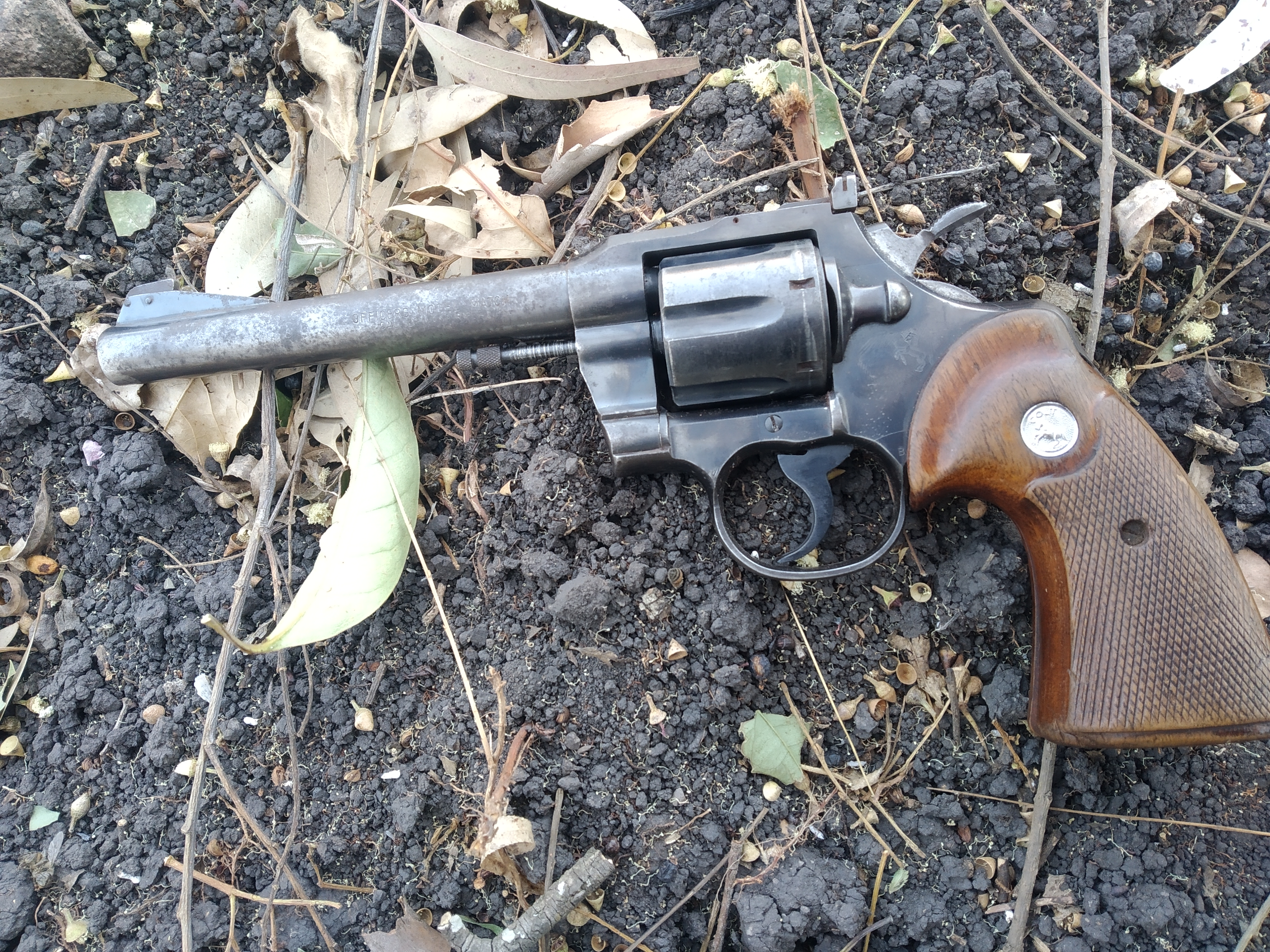
- Colt Officer's Model Match .22 LR
- Type: Revolver
- Place of origin: United States

Production history
- Manufacturer: Colt's Patent Firearms Manufacturing Company
- Produced: 1904–1972
- Variants: Officer's Model Target; Officer's Model Target Rimfire; Officer's Model Special; Officer's Model Match

Specifications
- Mass: 1,075 g (2.37 lb)-1,220 g (2.69 lb)
- Length: 286 mm (11.26 in)
- Barrel length: 152 mm (5.98 in)
- Cartridge: .22 Long Rifle; .32-20; .38 Special; .38 Long Colt
- Action: double-action
- Feed system: six round cylinder
- Sights: Fixed iron: Blade front, V-notch rear
- References: Specs for 6 inches barrel versions

The Colt Officer's Model is a double-action revolver with a medium frame, produced between 1904 and 1972 and which was mainly focused on sport shooting and of which four variants stand out: Officer's Model Target, Officer's Model Target Rimfire, Officer's Model Special and Officer's Model Match.

== History and development ==
The first variant, the Officer's Model Target appeared in 1904 as a Premium model more focused on sport shooting than on common use, it was produced in 7.94 mm (.32) and 9 mm (.38) calibers, with barrels whose lengths ranged from 4 in (101.6 mm) to 7.5 in (190.5 mm), with 6 in (152.4 mm) being the most common. The first weapons were produced with a drum that rotated counterclockwise, however, after the introduction of the Colt Army Special in 1908, the direction of rotation of the drum was reversed.

In 1930 the Officer's Model Target Rimfire appeared, which was a .22 LR caliber version of the Model Target and was only produced with a 6-inch barrel. Both versions of the Target were discontinued until 1972.

In 1949 the Officer's Model Special was announced, which was only produced chambered for the .22 LR and .38 Special cartridges, which featured an adjustable Coltmaster rear sight. It was replaced in 1953 by the Officer's Model Match, which was produced in the same calibers until 1972, the only difference being that the Special had a Colt "E" frame, while the Match had a "J" frame, in addition, it featured an adjustable Accro rear sight.

== Design ==
Early versions of the Officer's Model were built with the Colt "E" frame just like its contemporary the Colt Official Police. The units manufactured before the World War II, being "Premium" weapons, received a heat treatment (not chemical) that left them with an intense blue bluing finish.

Revolvers produced before the war used a flanged screw and bolt to hold the barrel in place. When the screw is removed, the flange of the screw pushes up on the drum retaining bolt. Postwar revolvers used a head screw, spring and bolt arrangement. The screw is actually a cap that retains the drum retaining bolt and spring.

New in box (NIB) examples of Officer's Model Target can be valued between $1,900ºº and $2,000ºº USD, used specimens in excellent condition can be valued between $1,350ºº and $1,400ºº USD, meanwhile used examples in excellent condition of Officer's Model Match can be valued between $750ºº and $1,000ºº USD.
