= Dardick tround =

Triangular firearms cartridge

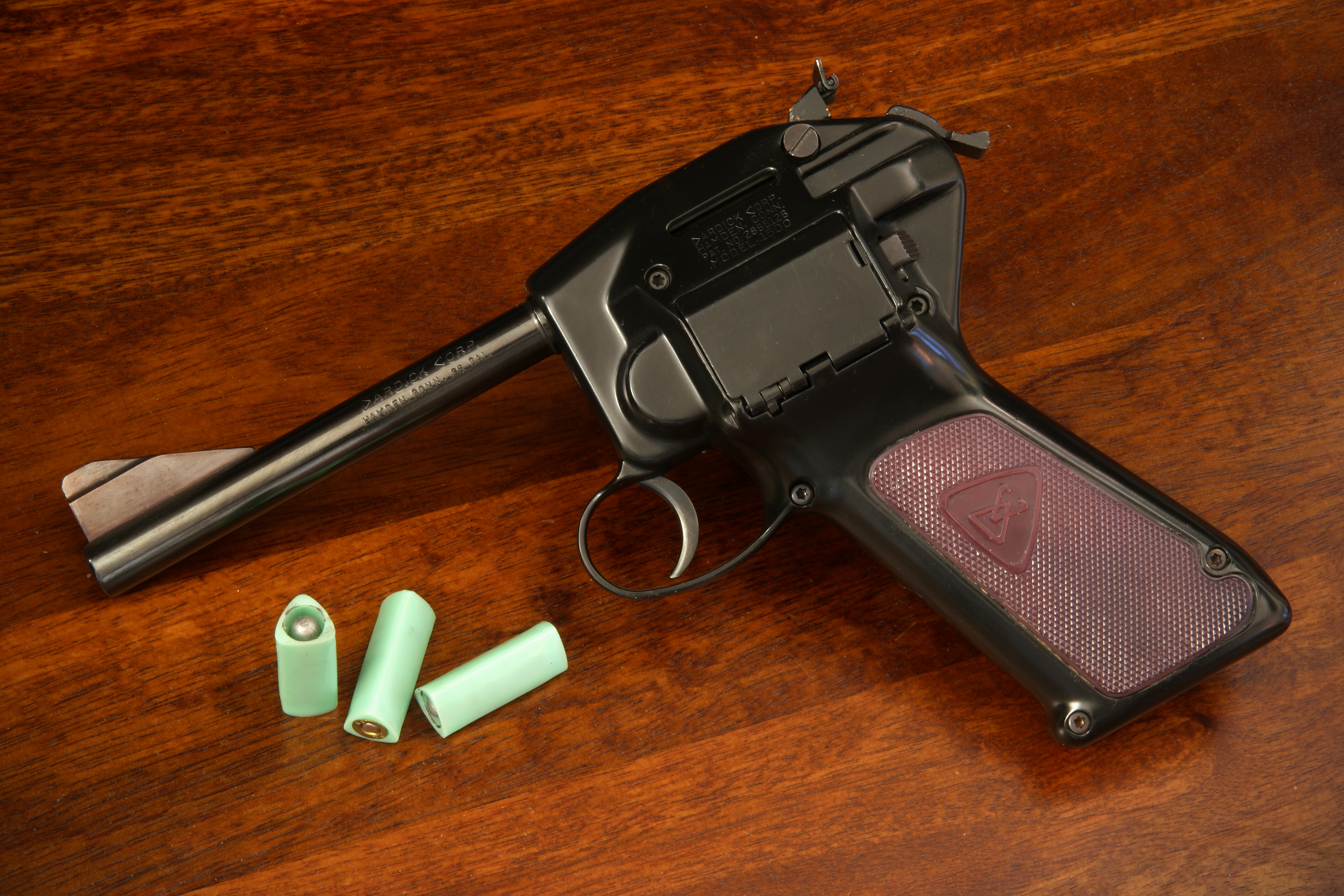
Dardick 1500 with trounds

The Dardick tround, or simply tround (triangular round), is a unique firearms cartridge developed by inventor David Dardick for use in his open-chamber firearms. Named for its convex triangular shape, the tround allowed the firearm's chamber to be open on one side, removing the requirement for reciprocating motion when chambering and ejecting a cartridge.

It was used in several revolvers: the 10-tround Dardick Model 1100, the 11 or 15-tround Model 1500—and the 20-tround Model 2000.

== Open-chamber firearm design ==
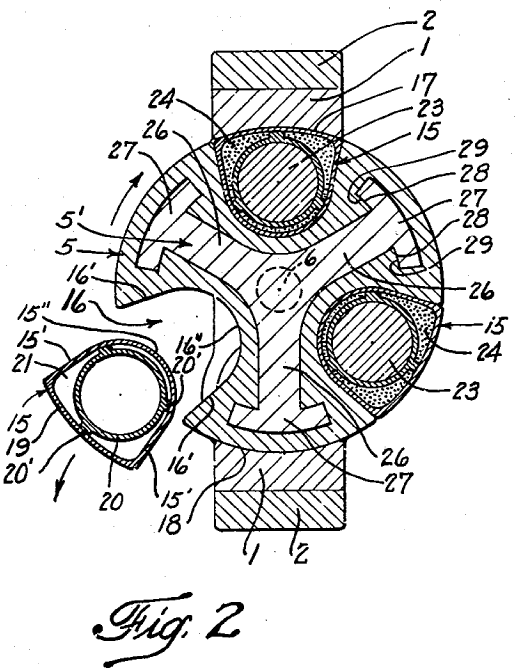
Patent drawing of open-chamber gun

Dardick (an associate of Melvin M. Johnson) began development of his open-chamber gun in the late 1940s. Dardick's patent 2,847,784, issued in August 1958, is for a pre-stressed open-chamber gun with rotatable cylinder. Essentially this design was a revolver with the exterior of the chambers opened up, forming an open U shape rather than a closed O shape found on typical revolvers. This allowed cartridges to be inserted from the side of the cylinder, rather than from the front or rear, and allowed the cylinder to be rapidly loaded from a magazine.

To contain the pressure of firing, an odd number of chambers (typically three) are milled into the cylinder. The cylinder is placed, centered, in a strong frame, so that when ready to fire, the cartridge rests against one side of the frame, and the opposite side of the cylinder rests against the opposite side of the frame. Upon firing, the force is spread to the frame from the cartridge on one side and the cylinder from the other. The pre-stressed part of the design applies to the frame; it is assembled from two parts, which are machined so that the exterior part must be heated, thus expanding, before the interior part can be inserted. Upon cooling, the exterior part contracts, putting the interior frame under compression. This compression counters the pressure put upon the frame by firing.

Unlike a traditional firearms cartridge, whose case is roughly cylindrical, the open chamber requires the cartridge to be otherwise. Since the cartridge contacts the frame upon firing, one side of the cartridge must match the curvature of the cylinder's exterior, while the other side of the cartridge must match the half-chamber of the cylinder. Together, the cylinder and frame form the chamber, and the cartridge must not only fit in this space, but also must seal it upon firing, and not deform to prevent cylinder rotation.

At this point the rounds are not the familiar three sided shape seen in Dardick's production firearms. They are, rather, cylindrical on one side (the side facing the cylinder axis) and nearly flat on the other (the side facing the frame). This patent defined the open-chamber gun concept, however, and quickly led to the development of the tround.

== Triangular cartridge theory ==
During the 1950s U.S. military experiments with feeding devices for machine guns found that triangular cartridge cases would stack into 50 percent less space than conventional round cartridge casings. Due to problems in reliably feeding a triangular cartridge from a magazine into a triangular chamber in a gun barrel, the concept was not further pursued.

== Tround development ==
Patent drawing of tround

Dardick's patent 2,865,126, issued in late 1958, is for a new and improved cartridge for the open-chamber gun. Unlike the previous open-chamber cartridge, this version shows the symmetrical tround shape, which would facilitate feeding from a magazine, since the trounds can enter the split in any orientation and end up seating correctly. This reduced the complexity and cost of the open-chamber firearm design, making it feasible for commercial production. The trounds were constructed of either high-strength plastic or aluminum to provide strength.

=== Tround adapters ===
While trounds could be complete firearms cartridges, many trounds were made as chamber adapters which held a standard cartridge, such as a .38 Special.

=== SALVO trounds ===
Dardick's patent 3,855,931, issued in 1974, expands the tround to hold multiple projectiles, firing through a set of barrels (one per projectile), making a Project SALVO–type gun. This type of tround, holding three projectiles, was used in the H & R Firearms SPIW prototype. However it was rejected due to issues with weight (due to the three barrels) and strength of the tround when used with the high-velocity flechette ammunition.

=== Tround Terra-drill ===
The Tround Terra-drill is described in patent 4,004,642, issued to Dardick in 1977. The Terra-drill is a drill head that combines a traditional drill bit with the SALVO tround. The tround is used to break through hard spots that the drill bit cannot readily penetrate. This version uses four ceramic bullets, which shatter upon impacting the rock, and which in turn are intended to fracture the rock to allow the drill bit to proceed. The tround is designed such that each projectile impacts the target at a slightly different time, imparting multiple shocks to create constructive interference of the shock waves in the target material.

Patent drawing of SALVO tround

Patent drawing of Terra-drill

== Dardick firearms ==
The Dardick firearms were essentially revolvers whose unique open chambers could be reloaded from a magazine. The operating principle used was the same as a double-action revolver, with a long trigger pull serving to rotate the cylinder, cock, and release the hammer. Since the commercial trounds had the same exterior dimensions, the same firearm action would, by using a different barrel, chamber any of the calibers the trounds were chambered in.

The Dardick Model 1100 had a 10-tround magazine, and was only available chambered in .38 Dardick Tround (9 mm). The Model 1500 came with interchangeable barrels, and was available in .38 (9 mm), .30 (7.62 mm), and .22 (5.56 mm) trounds, with a carbine conversion kit also available in .38 and .22. The Model 1500 could be configured to hold 11 or 15 trounds, and came with 4- or 6-inch barrel lengths. A Model 2000 with a 20-tround capacity is also reported to exist. All versions used a non-removable magazine, which could be loaded with stripper clips or one tround at a time. The Dardick revolvers proved to be a commercial failure, despite being, in the words of one reviewer, "as versatile as a six-armed monkey".
