= RSh-12 =

Russian-made handgun

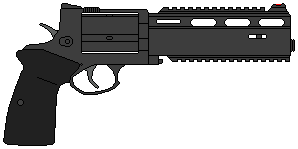
- Illustration of the RSh-12
- Type: Revolver
- Place of origin: Russia

Production history
- Manufacturer: TsKIB SOO

Specifications
- Mass: 2.2 kg (4.9 lb)
- Length: 357 mm (14.1 in) with no stock and no silencer 462 mm (18.2 in) with folded stock 679 mm (26.7 in) with unfolded stock 830 mm (33 in) with unfolded stock and a silencer
- Width: 53 mm (2.1 in)
- Height: 159 mm (6.3 in)
- Cartridge: 12.7×55mm STs-130
- Action: Double-action revolver
- Feed system: 5-round cylinder (RSh-12 and MTs-569); 6-round cylinder (RSh-9 and MTs-570)

The RSh-12 (Russian: Револьвер Штурмовой калибра 12,7, romanized: Revolver Shturmovoy kalibra 12.7, lit. 'Assault revolver calibre 12.7') is a Russian-made revolver chambered in 12.7×55mm STs-130. It was developed at the request of, and is believed to be in limited service with, the FSB's counter-terrorism units.

The RSh-12 fires from the bottom chamber of the cylinder (like the Chiappa Rhino and Mateba Autorevolver) rather than the more common top chamber, and is chambered for the same ammunition as the ShAK-12 battle rifle and VKS rifle. It achieves a relatively light trigger pull on follow-up shots by using the recoiling barrel, upper frame, and cylinder assembly to compress an internal hammer spring as they slide back on the grip frame. This differs from true recoil-operated revolvers such as the Webley-Fosbery and Mateba Autorevolver, which use the recoiling upper assembly to rotate the cylinder and cock the hammer.

== Variants ==
=== Military variant ===
- RSh-12: Chambered in 12.7×55mm.
- RSh-9: Chambered in 9×39mm.

=== Civilian variant ===
A carbine variant was revealed in 2020—though no information on availability or pricing has yet been released. It features a swing-out cylinder, picatinny rails above and below the barrel, and a skeletonised shoulder stock attached permanently to the grip frame. The 12.7mm MTs-569 version features a spring-buffered buttplate to dampen recoil.

- MTs-569: Chambered in 12.7×55mm
- MTs-570: Chambered in 9×39mm

== Users ==
- Russian Federation: Believed to be in limited service with the FSB.

== In popular culture ==
The RSh-12 appears in the 2026 survival horror video game Resident Evil Requiem, where it is depicted as an oversized revolver under the name "Requiem" and used by Leon S. Kennedy and Grace Ashcroft. The weapon's depiction prompted fans to create memes and fan art highlighting its large size.

== See also ==
- ShAK-12
- Mateba Autorevolver
- Chiappa Rhino
- MP-412 REX
- Rifle-caliber handgun
