= Emilio Ghisoni =

Italian inventor and firearms designer

- Born: Emilio Ghisoni; 1937; Pavia, Kingdom of Italy
- Died: 28 April 2008 (aged 71); Pavia, Italy
- Occupation: Inventor

Emilio Ghisoni (1937 – 28 April 2008) was an Italian inventor and firearm designer, best known for his innovative work with revolvers.

== Biography ==
Ghisoni was born in Pavia, northern Italy in 1937, and attended university to follow a course in classical studies. His father founded a company, Macchine Termo-Balistiche (Mateba), that manufactured pasta kneading machinery and other food processing equipments. The death of his father, who ran the company, caused Ghisoni to leave school in 1956 to learn the business. He later became a mechanical engineer and a designer of food processing equipment.

An avid firearms enthusiast, he had an interest in designing revolvers. His designs came from wanting to improve accuracy in international rapid-fire competitions. He accomplished this by aligning the barrel with the lower chamber of the cylinder instead of the top in order to lower the bore axis and minimize the muzzle rise due to recoil. In the 1970s he designed his first prototype: a revolver with a lower barrel and cylinder in front of the trigger guard.

He followed this with:

- The Mateba MT1, a .22 LR semi-automatic pistol, produced in small numbers in 1980.
- Mateba MTR-8 of 1983.
- Mateba 2006M.
- Mateba Autorevolver.
- Chiappa Rhino revolver.

He died in 2008 at the age of 71 following a bone tumor.

== See also ==
- Mateba
