= Pardini GT9 =

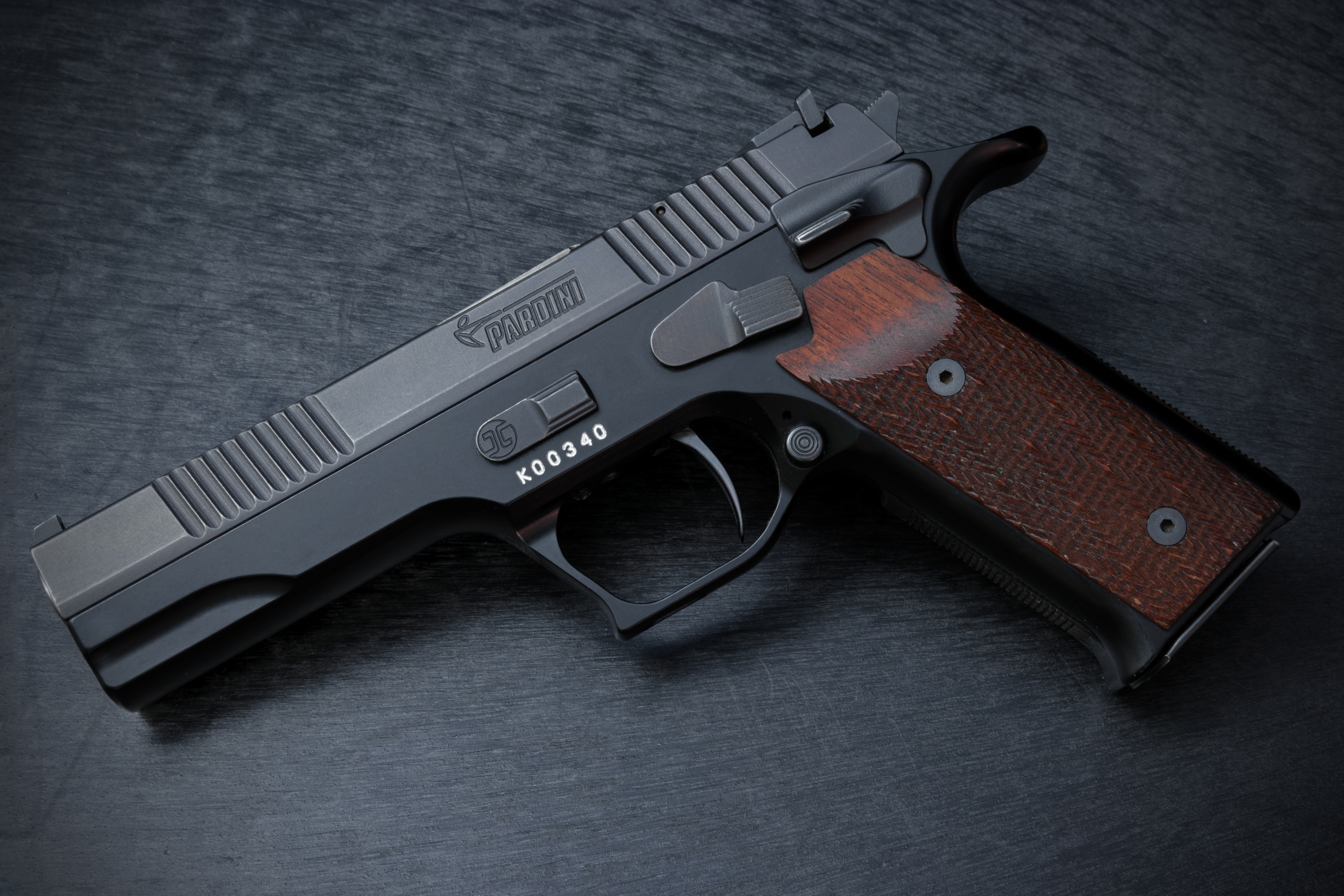
- Type: Semi-automatic pistol
- Place of origin: Italy

Production history
- Designer: Giampiero Pardini
- Manufacturer: Pardini Arms
- Unit cost: $2400–$2600
- Variants: GT45

Specifications
- Mass: 1,070 grams (38 oz)
- Length: 225 millimetres (8.9 in)
- Barrel length: 127 or 152.5 mm (5.00 or 6.00 in)
- Cartridge: 9×21mm or 9×19mm (GT9).40 S&W (GT40).45 ACP (GT45)
- Action: Short recoil, modified Browning
- Feed system: 17-round box magazine (GT9); 19-round box magazine (GT9); 17-round box magazine (GT40); 13-round box magazine (GT45)
- Sights: Iron

The Pardini GT9 is a semi-automatic pistol chambered in 9×21mm or 9×19mm Parabellum, depending on the market. It is manufactured by Pardini Arms in Italy, a company founded by former competition shooter Giampiero Pardini and that exclusively manufactures sporting arms.

== Design ==
The GT9 is a pure competition pistol with adjustable single-action push mechanism, relatively high weight and with a low bore axis. It is chambered for the 9×19mm Parabellum cartridge, or alternately the 9×21mm cartridge in markets where civilian use of the 9×19mm is restricted, such as Italy. Magazine capacity is 17 rounds with flush-fitting magazines, and 19 rounds with extended magazines.

The GT pistols all have a 115-degree grip angle and a high grip for straight-back recoiling (minimal muzzle rise). Each pistol comes with two magazines, extra recoil spring, tool bag, owners manual, and a hard protective case. Color is silver (chromium slide) or black (burnished slide).

== Variants ==
The GT40 is chambered in .40 S&W and comes with a factory-installed magwell and extended magazines with a capacity of 17 rounds. The GT45 is chambered in .45 ACP with flush-fitting magazines with a capacity of 13 rounds. Pardini also offers conversion kits for the GT45, enabling it to chamber 9mm or .40 S&W cartridges. These kits include a slide, barrel, recoil spring, recoil spring guide, and two magazines.

"Long slide" versions are also available. The GT9-1 and GT45 II have 152.5-millimetre (6.00 in) barrels, compared to the 127-millimetre (5.0 in) barrels of the GT9, GT40 and GT45. There is no long slide version of the GT40.
