= Hudson H9 =

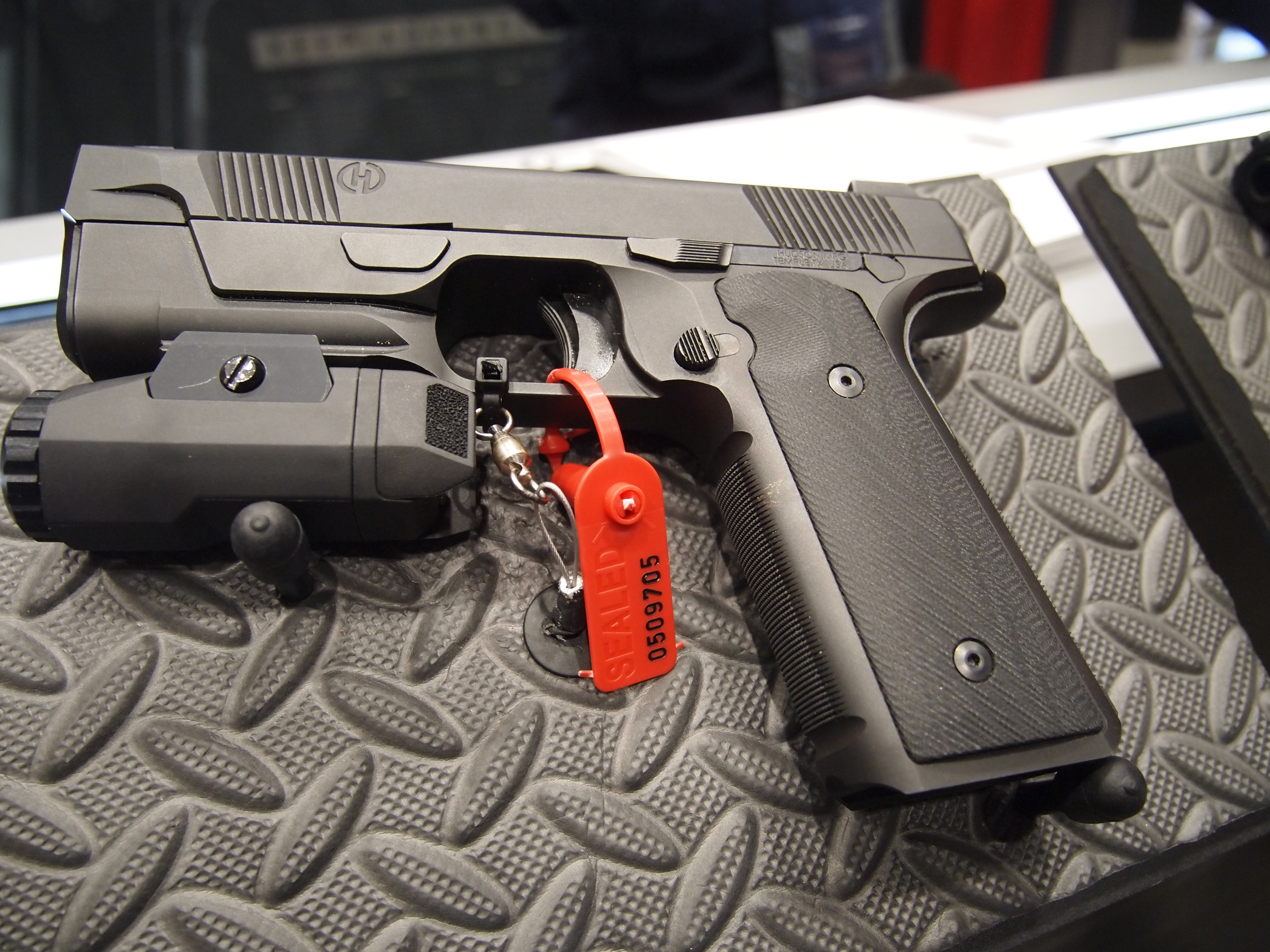
- Hudson H9
- Type: Semi-automatic pistol
- Place of origin: USA

Service history
- In service: TBD

Production history
- Designer: Cy and Lauren Hudson
- Designed: 2017
- Manufacturer: Hudson Mfg, Temple, Texas, United States
- Unit cost: $1,147
- Produced: 2017–2019
- Variants: H9 (34 oz (960 g)); H9A (26 oz (740 g))

Specifications
- Mass: 34 oz (963.9 g) (unloaded)
- Length: 7.625 in (193.7 mm)
- Barrel length: 4.28 in (108.7 mm)
- Width: 1.24 in (31.5 mm)
- Height: 5.225 in (132.7 mm)
- Caliber: 9×19mm Parabellum
- Action: Short recoil operated, locked breech
- Rate of fire: Semi-automatic
- Feed system: 15-round box magazine (9×19mm Parabellum)
- Sights: Trijicon HD front sight

The Hudson H9 is a semi-automatic pistol made by the now defunct Hudson Mfg. Unveiled at the 2017 SHOT Show in Las Vegas, Nevada after three years of development, the H9 brought multiple patented and patent pending features together in a new pistol design. Proven design elements included: an M1911 straight-pull trigger, a short-recoil operated system, and the heritage S&W 5900 series magazine tube. The new design elements were: forward barrel cams in front of the trigger-guard, the sear design marrying the straight pull trigger with a striker-fired system while remaining drop safe, the placement of the recoil spring, and the pairing of an insert chassis with a steel frame. These elements lent to its most noticeable difference—its appearance.

The striker-fired H9 was made first chambered in 9×19mm Parabellum at a weight of 34 oz (960 g) with a capacity of 15 rounds. The 34 oz (960 g) weight places the H9 within the same category as traditional aluminum frame handguns like the Beretta M9, Sig P226, and Sig P229. The H9 accomplished the lighter weight all steel construction through the insert and grip construction (traditionally called a frame) and the redistribution of the surface area of the pistol itself. Traditional all-steel pistols are usually heavier than their aluminum counterparts: the 1911 (43 oz (1,200 g)), the 5906 (38 oz (1,100 g)), and the CZ-75 SP-01 (40.5 oz (1,150 g)).

In March 2019 Hudson Mfg declared bankruptcy leaving questions about the future of the H9.

Daniel Defense bought the Hudson H9 patents, and launched an updated design as the Daniel H9 on January 22, 2024.

== Product variants ==
Hudson announced a new modification of the pistol under the name of H9A at the 2018 SHOT Show. The H9A, the "A" designation standing for aluminum, should have taken the H9 operating system to 26 oz (740 g) by the use of an aluminum grip. This approach differs from traditional aluminum designs like the SIG 226, since Hudson used the same steel insert chassis in the H9A construction, meaning the slide rails and impact surfaces remain steel. The 26 oz (740 g) weight brings the H9A into the same weight class as the HK VP9 (25.56 oz (725 g)), the Archon Type B (29.6 oz (840 g)) and 1911 lightweight defender variants.

The announcement of the H9A caused an Osborne effect and the company was not able to sell the H9s it manufactured.

The acquisition of Daniel Defense lead to a variance of additions to their own variant of the H9 design: The weight would be slightly greater than original production variants (29.6.oz unloaded) with slightly different sights in addition to a fiber optic sight.

== Design history ==
In an interview, CEO Cy Hudson said the location of the recoil spring down in front of the trigger guard was designed to give the gun "a high grip purchase—what most people call a low bore axis—that's really close to the slide. Your barrel is right above your grip, and the recoil impulse from that recoil spring is directed into the meat of your hand." This type of feature leads to less felt recoil and muzzle rise when shooting.

== Company status ==
In August 2018, a lawsuit was filed against Hudson Mfg for breach of contract and failure to pay for parts. In December 2018, the Facebook Hudson H9 Group carried many discussions regarding broken H9 pistols and their return to Hudson Mfg for repair work. Continued discussions through January 2019 reported that those H9s sent back to Hudson had still not been repaired or returned to their owners, and Cy Hudson stopped responding to those discussions or any others on the forum. Hudson Mfg. reserved a booth at the 2019 SHOT Show but never showed, leading to numerous rumors. As of January 28, 2019 the corporate phone number in Temple TX does not work. On March 14, 2019 Hudson Mfg. LLC filed for bankruptcy in Texas western bankruptcy court.

== See also ==
- Laugo Alien
