= Laugo Alien =

Semi-automatic pistol

Laugo Arms Alien is a semi-automatic pistol in 9×19 mm manufactured by the Czech company Laugo Arms Czechoslovakia. Launched at IWA OutdoorClassics in 2019, it won Recoil Magazine's top award at SHOT Show 2020. It has combined several radical design features having a fixed barrel, gas-delayed blowback and non-reciprocating top sight rail.

== History ==
Ján Lučanský started the development of the pistol around 2013, and holds patents for this pistol. The company Laugo Arms Czechoslovakia was founded by Ján Lučánský together with former marketing director of Česká Zbrojovka Ondřej Poděl and investor Daniel Selichar. In 2021, Ján Lučanský and Ondřej Poděl sold their share in the company.

In 2023, agents of the Security Service of Ukraine escorting president Volodymyr Zelenskyy and HUR chief Kyrylo Budanov were seen using Laugo Alien pistols during a visit to Snake Island.

In 2025 the company was acquired by the Anacot capital group owned by ex minister Pavel Drobil

== Technical ==
The Alien has a gas-delayed mechanism and a fixed barrel which enables good precision, a low bore axis for less barrel lift and an internal slide which means that the sights remain stationary to the barrel during firing, which results in less negative recoil and thereby longer lifespan for reflex sights. The grip angle on the first models had a large rake angle (much like the Glock or Luger), but since 2023 the grip angle has been more similar to the Colt 1911.

== See also ==
- Hudson H9
