= Automatic revolver =

Self-revolving and cocking revolver

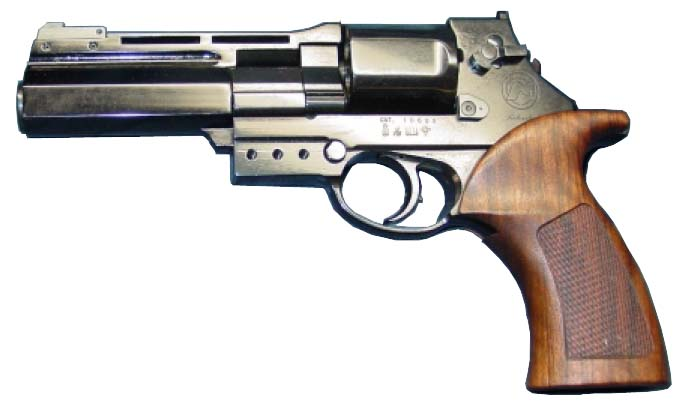
The Mateba Autorevolver

An automatic revolver also known as semi-automatic revolver, is a revolver that uses the recoil energy of firing for cocking the hammer and revolving the cylinder, rather than using manual operations to perform these actions. As semi-automatic firearms, the shooter must manually operate the trigger to discharge each shot.

Examples of genuine semi-automatic revolvers are extremely uncommon, and the term is inaccurately applied to break-open revolvers with a mechanical linkage ejector that automatically empties spent (and unspent) casings from the cylinder upon opening of the breech.

== History ==
An automatic revolver was communicated to Moses Poole, a patent agent, in 1841. The exact identity of the inventor of this weapon is unknown but in all likelihood it was a Frenchman by the name of Philippe Mathieu, who had patented, amongst several different types of revolver, an almost identical design two years previously. Another automatic revolver was communicated to British patent agent William Edward Newton by the Americans Mershon and Hollingsworth in 1854. Both of these weapons used clockwork as the power for achieving automatic operation. In 1863 a gas piston-operated revolver was designed by a Spanish gunsmith named Orbea. The Webley-Fosbery Automatic Revolver was designed in 1895 and became the first commercial and best-known semi-automatic revolver.

== Description ==
A standard revolver is a manually operated weapon, using the action of cocking the hammer to advance the cylinder in a single-action, or the action of pulling the trigger to advance the cylinder and cock the hammer in a double-action. The idea behind an automatic revolver is to automate both actions, removing the need to manually cock the hammer between shots while retaining the lighter trigger pull of the single-action.

This is accomplished by use of a reciprocating slide on the upper part of the frame, the motion of which is used to rotate the cylinder and cock the hammer in much the same way as is used in the majority of semi-automatic pistol designs.

=== Examples ===
- The Norwegian Landstad revolver, designed and introduced in 1900. Its very unusual design featured a flat cylinder with two chambers, in which the bottom chamber was loaded from a sideways-inserted magazine that also functioned as the left grip plate. During firing, the revolver's reciprocating bolt would extract and eject the round from the top chamber after firing, load a round into the bottom chamber, and then rotate the cylinder. The revolver would then be ready to fire again. It was chambered for the 7.5mm Nagant cartridge, which at the time was also used in both the Norwegian and Swedish versions of the Belgian Nagant M1895 revolver.
- The Webley-Fosbery Automatic Revolver was the first commercial example, introduced in 1901. It was recoil-operated, and the cylinder and barrel recoiled backwards to cock the hammer and revolve the cylinder. It was distinctive in that cam grooves were milled on the outside of the cylinder to provide a means of advancing to the next chamber—half a turn as the cylinder moved back, and half a turn as it moved forward. .38 caliber versions held 8 shots, .455 caliber versions 6. Around 4,750 were made in total.
- The Union Automatic Revolver of American origin. Only around 65 examples made.
- The Zulaica Automatic Revolver M. Zulaica y Cia., Eibar, Spain. began manufacturing "Velo-Dog" type pocket revolvers in the early 1900s. In 1905, Zulaica patented an unusual .22 LR automatic revolver design, but few were ever manufactured and even fewer have survived. Zulaica started manufacturing "Eibar" type automatic pistols under French army contracts in 1915 and 1916, and continued to market them commercially up to the 1920s.
- In 1997, the Mateba company developed a type of recoil-operated automatic revolver, the Mateba Unica auto-revolver, which uses recoil energy to auto-rotate a revolver cylinder holding six or seven cartridges, depending on the model. The company has made several versions of its "autorevolver", including longer barreled and even rifle-like variations, usually chambered for .357 Magnum ammunition, but also available in larger calibers such as .44 Magnum and .454 Casull.

== See also ==
- Revolver cannon
- Dardick tround
