= ShAK-12 =

Russian large-caliber bullpup rifle

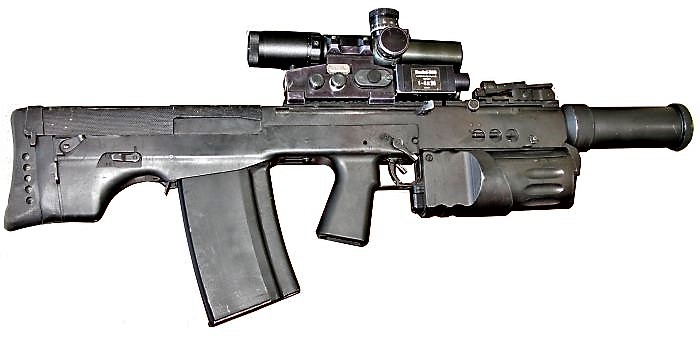
- A right-side view of the ShAK-12
- Type: special-purpose carbine
- Place of origin: Russia

Service history
- In service: 2011–present
- Used by: Russian Spetsnaz

Production history
- Designer: TsKIB SOO
- Manufacturer: Izhmash
- Produced: 2010–Present

Specifications
- Mass: 6 kg (13 lb)
- Length: 1,020 mm (40 in)
- Cartridge: 12.7×55mm STs-130
- Caliber: 12.7 mm (0.50 in)
- Action: Short recoil operation
- Rate of fire: 500–750 rounds/min
- Muzzle velocity: 290–315 m/s
- Effective firing range: 100–300 metres (330–980 ft)
- Feed system: 10- and 20-round detachable box magazines
- Sights: Iron sights, Picatinny rail for various optics

The ShAK-12, (Russian: ШАК-12) originally under the name ASh-12.7 (Russian: АШ-12.7, Автомат штурмовой 12.7мм, lit. 'Automatic Assault Carbine 12.7mm') is a dedicated CQB/urban operations weapon, developed by TsKIB SOO, a subsidiary of the KBP Instrument Design Bureau of Tula, Russia, by request from the Russian Federal Security Service (FSB). The weapon was designed with extreme short-range stopping power in mind for FSB urban combat units. According to the Russian press, the first batch of ShAK-12 rifles were delivered to the FSB in late 2011.

== Overview ==
The ShAK-12 is a dedicated "Close/Urban combat" weapon for high-risk law enforcement operations, which must combine high stopping power with limited penetration and a short 'dangerous range', to avoid collateral damage to innocent bystanders or hostages. To achieve these goals, the designers of the ShAK-12 developed special large-calibre ammunition, loaded with a variety of bullets. The ammunition used for the ShAK-12 is the 12.7×55mm straight-walled, rimless brass case based on .338 Lapua Magnum, originally developed by the same organization that developed the silenced VKS sniper rifle. Standard loading for the ShAK-12 is a lightweight, subsonic ammunition with an aluminium core, exposed at the front and hollowed at the rear and partially enclosed into a bi-metal jacket. The cartridge has a bullet weight of 7-33 grams when utilizing ShAK-12 loads. It has several loadings; light, heavy and a duplex load with two light bullets.

This new Russian cartridge bears certain conceptual similarities to a family of big-bore cartridges developed in the US for the AR-15 platform, such as .458 SOCOM, .499 LWR or .50 Beowulf, although the Russian cartridge uses a longer case and generally a heavier bullet load. Its US counterparts are usually loaded with bullets weighing 19 grams and up.

== Design ==
The ShAK-12 features a bullpup layout, with a stamped steel receiver and a polymer housing/stock. It utilizes a short recoil operating system, which means that after it fires the round the barrel slides backwards with the bolt for a short distance, utilizing the recoil of the cartridge, while the bolt keeps traveling backwards fully to eject the spent shell casing without redirecting gasses. It is unknown what kind of locking system it uses, however it most likely uses a 2 or 3 lug rotating bolt. Firing controls include two separate levers; a fire mode selector (Semi/Auto) at the rear and an ambidextrous safety (Safe/Fire) above the pistol grip. There are several configurations of the basic rifle. The first one features an integral carrying handle with a built-in rear diopter sight and a folding front sight. A length of Picatinny rail is installed on the carrying handle to accept various optical sights. Another version that was observed on some photos features a "flat top" configuration with a Picatinny rail running on top of the receiver, as well as front and rear sights installed on folding bases. Other variations have a Picatinny rail below the fore end or a 40mm underbarrel grenade launcher. Muzzle devices include a muzzle brake or a quickly-detachable suppressor. The Russian Federal Security Service has adopted the ShAK-12 in small numbers, with other designs such as the Dragunov sniper rifle and Heckler & Koch MR308 remaining more common.

== Ammunition ==
- 12,7x55mm Легкая Пуля (Legkaya Pulya (LP) > "Light Bullet") [Bullet Weight: 7 grams (108 grains)] Light supersonic saboted lead bullet with an aluminum core.
- 12,7x55mm Тяжелая Пуля (Tyazhelaya Pulya (TP) > "Heavy Bullet") [Bullet Weight: 33 gram (509 grains)] Heavy subsonic lead bullet.
- 12,7x55mm Двухпульный (Dvukhpul'niy (DP) > "Double-Bulleted", "Duplex Bullet") [Bullet Weight: 17 grams (262 grains) each] Two bullets loaded inline.
- 12,7x55mm Бронебойная Пуля (Broneboynaya Pulya (BP) > "Armor-Piercing Bullet") [Bullet Weight: 18 grams (277 grains)] Lead bullet with an armor-piercing core.

== Users ==
- Russia: Adopted by the FSB

== See also ==
- RSh-12
- List of Russian weaponry
- List of bullpup firearms
