= Pardini Arms =

Italian sport firearms manufacturer

- Native name: Pardini Armi Srl
- Company type: Private
- Industry: Arms industry
- Founded: 1976
- Founder: Giampiero Pardini
- Headquarters: Italy
- Products: Firearms
- Website: www.pardini.it

Pardini Arms is an Italian firearms manufacturer founded in 1976 by Giampiero Pardini, a prominent marksman in Italian target shooting. The company specializes in firearms for competition use, producing air pistols, air rifles, small-caliber and large caliber handguns. Their pistols are known for their characteristic swept-back grips and low bore axis.

== Usage ==
Several of the firm's products are competitive at the international level, with seven medals being won by athletes equipped with Pardini's guns at the 2016 Summer Olympics. In another example, during the 2010 ISSF World Shooting Championships, approximately two-thirds of the rapid fire athletes used a Pardini pistol.

== Products ==
- FPE – FPM variant compliant with UK firearms regulation
- FPM – target pistol in .22 LR with a compensator
- GPR1 – air rifle in .177 caliber
- GT9 / GT40 / GT45 – competition pistol in 9mm, .40 S&W and .45 ACP
- HP – target pistol in .32 S&W
- K10 / K12 – air pistols in .177 caliber
- KID – youth air pistol in .177 caliber
- SP – target pistol in .22 LR

== Gallery ==
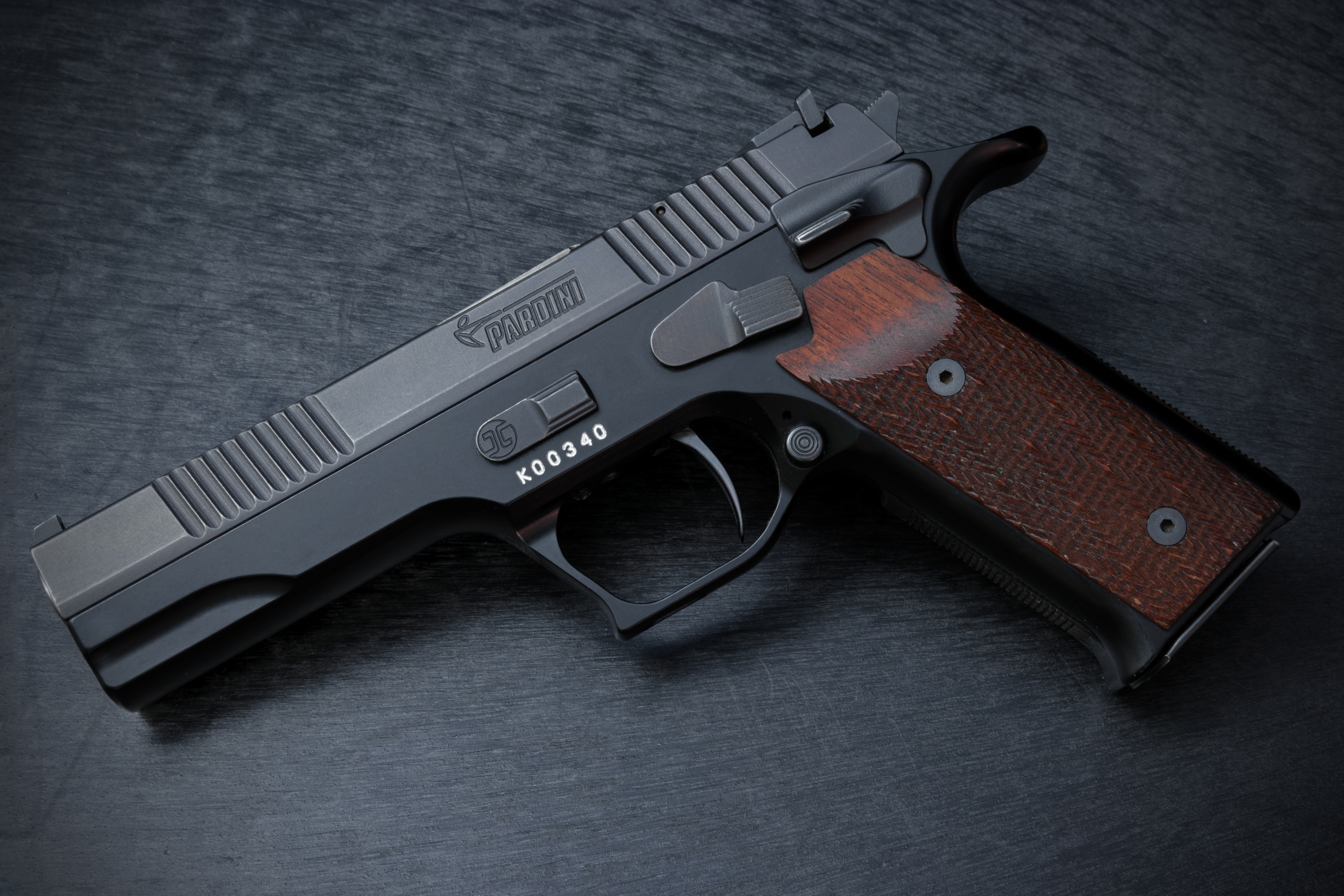
Pardini GT9

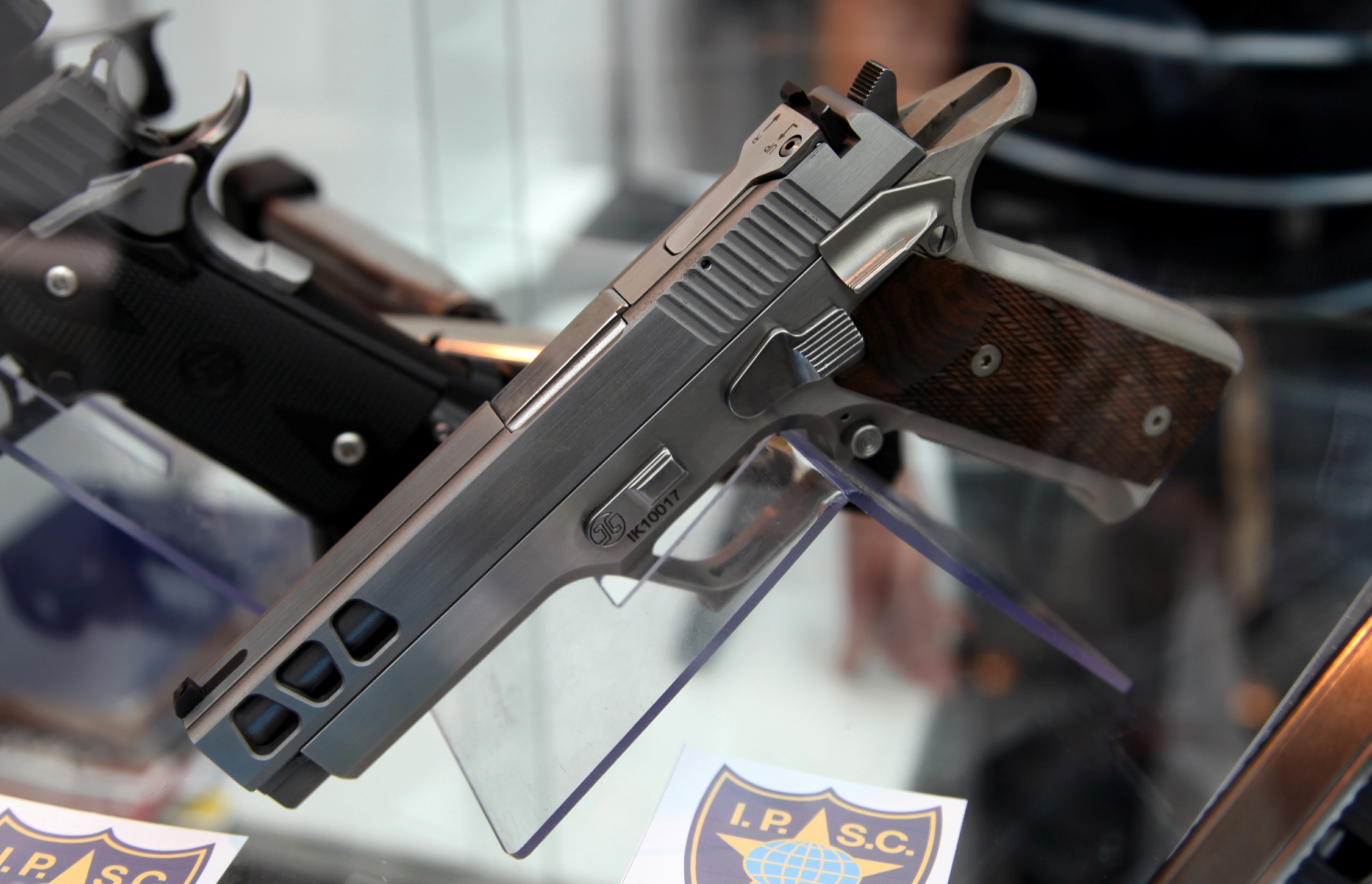
A limited edition of the 9mm GT9 pistol in stainless steel, with a 5-inch ventilated slide

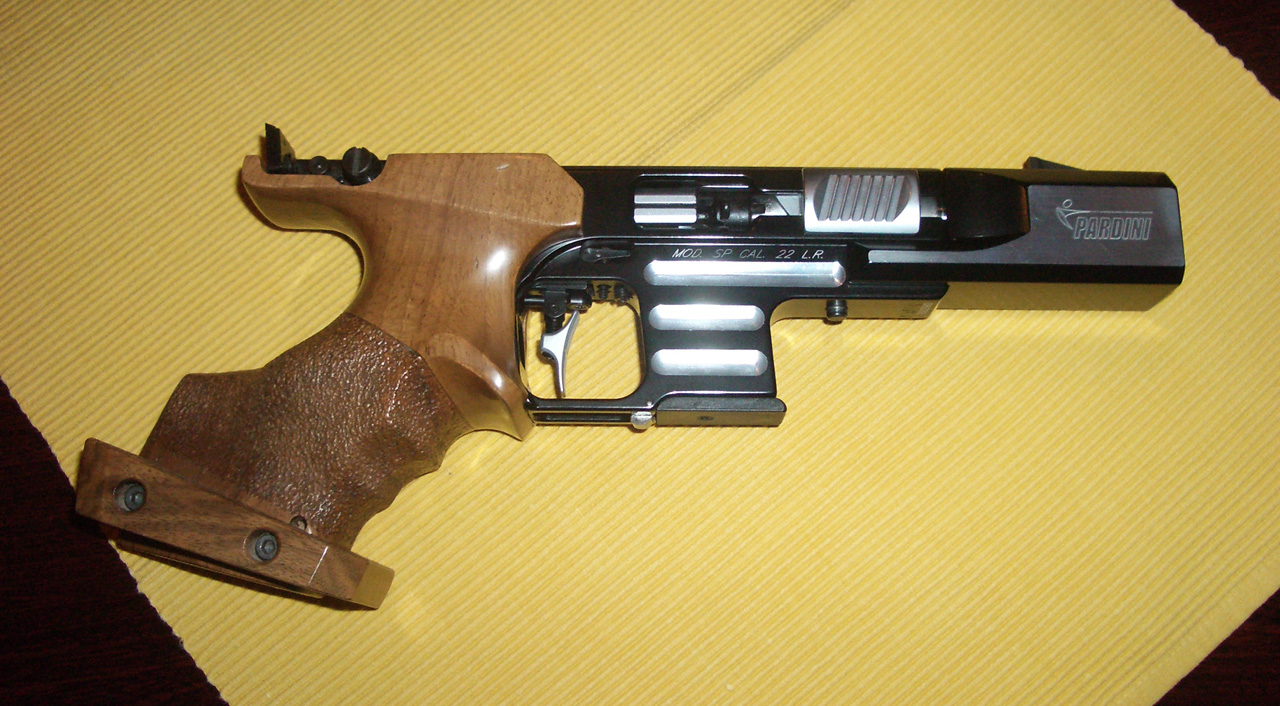
A .22 LR Pardini SP target pistol
