= Mateba Autorevolver =

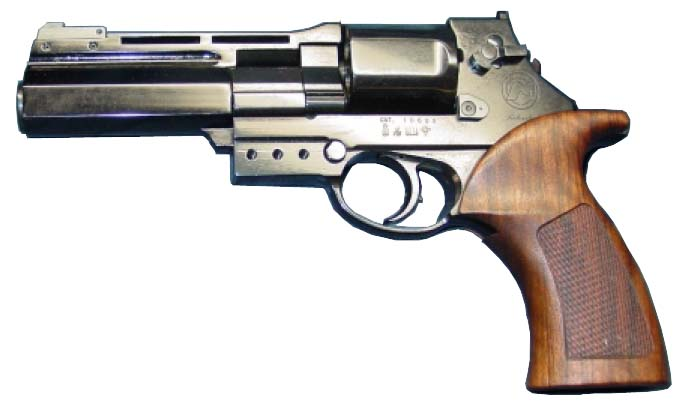
- Mateba Model 6 Unica (Dynamic Sportiva)
- Type: Automatic revolver
- Place of origin: Italy

Production history
- Designer: Emilio Ghisoni
- Designed: 1997
- Manufacturer: Mateba
- Produced: 1997–2005
- Variants: Variants

Specifications
- Mass: 2.96 lb (1.35 kg)
- Length: 275 mm (10.83 in)
- Barrel length: 76 mm (3 in), 102 mm (4 in), 127 mm (5 in), 152 mm (6 in), 178 mm (7 in), 203 mm (8 in), or 457 mm (18 in)
- Cartridge: .357 Magnum; .41 Magnum; .44 Magnum; .454 Casull
- Action: Recoil operated semi-automatic revolver
- Rate of fire: Semi-automatic
- Feed system: 6-Round Cylinder
- Sights: Iron sights Fixed Two-Dot Night Sight

The Mateba Model 6 Unica (often known simply as the Mateba or the Mateba Autorevolver) is a recoil operated semi-automatic revolver, one of only a few of this type ever produced. It was developed by Mateba, based in Pavia, Italy. Inventor Emilio Ghisoni (1937–2008), who was also famous for later designing the Chiappa Rhino, is listed as the owner of U.S. patent 4,712,466 which details the operation of the weapon.

== Design ==
The Mateba Model 6 uses the recoil from firing to rotate the cylinder and cock the hammer, unlike conventional revolvers, which depend on the user physically pulling the trigger and/or cocking the hammer to actuate the weapon's mechanism of operation.

The Mateba Autorevolver's barrel alignment is different from most other revolvers. The barrel is aligned with the bottom of the cylinder instead of the top. This lowers the bore axis (line of the barrel) which directs the recoil in line with the shooter's hand thereby reducing the twisting motion or muzzle flip of normal revolvers.

The gun's entire upper assembly (barrel, cylinder and frame) are mounted on rails on the lower frame, which houses the trigger, hammer, and grip, and recoils 1/2 of an inch, or 12.7mm, on firing. The rearward motion of the upper assembly cocks the hammer, and the cylinder is rotated on the forward stroke. This unique action makes this revolver a semi automatic weapon, making it one of the very few semi-automatic revolver designs, another notable design being the Webley–Fosbery Self-Cocking Automatic Revolver. The inclusion of the 454 Casull chambering makes the gun one of, if not the, most powerful semi-automatic handgun ever produced. This chambering places the Mateba in comparison to firearms like the Wildey pistol chambered in .475 Wildey Magnum and .44 Mag examples of the AutoMag pistol.

== Variants ==
The Mateba Autorevolver and Grifone were produced in three finishes:

- Blued
- Satin Nickel
- Polished Nickel (Up until 2000)

Early models of the Unica 6 Autorevolver did not include a mounting point at the front of the frame forward of the trigger guard, and instead had a simple bevel. Late model Unica 6's and Grifones are sometimes seen with mismatched parts, e.g. blued cylinders on a nickel frame or Grifone stamped parts mixed with Unica 6 parts, this was due to Italian bankruptcy laws requiring the company to continue operations after declaring insolvency without manufacturing any new inventory, while liquidating all existing inventory and assets. After this receivership period, all remaining stock leftover including parts was sold to CDNN Investments in Abilene, Texas and liquidated at discount rates.

The following are the primary variants of the Mateba revolver:

- Defense - 4" Barrel, .357 Magnum
- Home Protection - 5" Barrel, .44 Remington Magnum
- Dynamic Sportiva - Either 5"- or 6"-barrel, .357 Magnum, .41 Magnum, .44 Magnum
- Hunter - 8 3/8" threaded Barrel, .357 Magnum, .44 Remington Magnum (.44 S&W Special), .454 Casull

In addition, their barrels can be changed with interchangeable 3", 4", 5"-, 6"-, 7"- and 8"-inch barrels.

There was chambering in 30-357 AeT offered according to manuals released in 2000, it is unknown if any were actually produced in this caliber.

=== Mateba Grifone ===
Also available was the Mateba Grifone, a revolver carbine which came in three primary variants:

- Grifone - The standard Grifone mated a 460 mm (18 in) barrel, handguard and buttstock to the Autorevolver's frame and action and included a barrel shroud with 4 widely spaced slots at the top.
- Grifone MoSer - Chambered in .454 Casull and mated to a longer 510 mm (20 in) barrel, Including a longer shroud with 5 widely spaced slots at the top.
- Grifone Short - Included a shorter 320 mm (13 in) barrel and shroud with 4 narrowly spaced slots.

It was available in the following Calibers:

- .357 Magnum - Grifone, Grifone Short
- .41 Magnum - Grifone
- .44 Magnum - Grifone, Grifone Short
- .454 Casull - Grifone MoSer

The buttstock came in two styles, a solid traditionally shaped walnut stock, or a "skeletonized" style all metal stock with a walnut cheekrest.

== Multiple cartridge capability ==
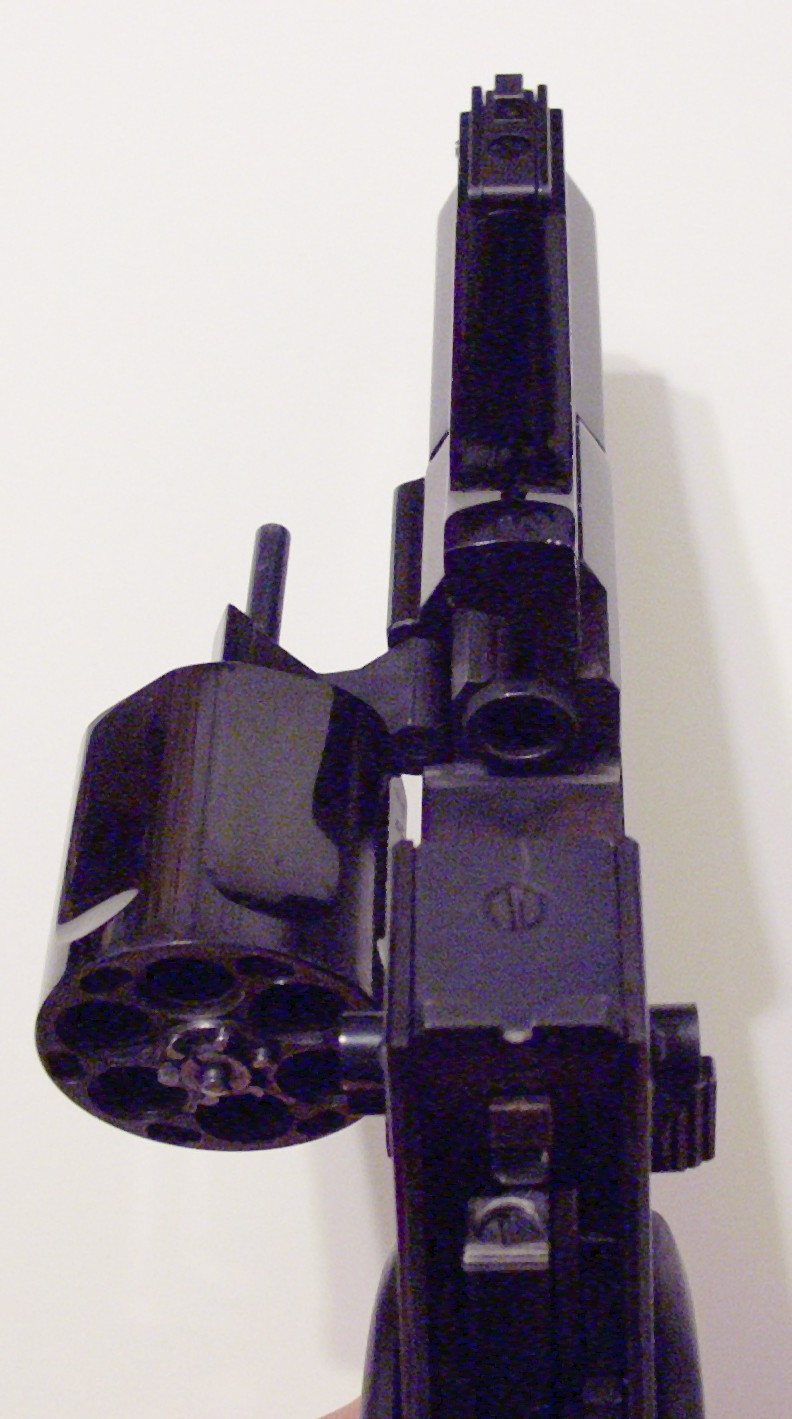
Rear view of the Unica 6 with cylinder in open position.

Mateba Autorevolvers chambered in .357 Magnum can be loaded with .38 Special ammunition. Typical .38 Special loads do not have enough power to fully cycle the recoil mechanism, but the weapon will still function with a double-action trigger pull. There are two optional recoil springs designed specifically for .38 Special cartridges that can be installed by the operator to overcome this problem (.38 Special and .38 wadcutter). Replacing the spring requires the removal of the slide assembly, which is blocked by a retaining pin held in place by a small set screw in the trigger guard. The barrel shroud acts as the spring keeper and guide rod bushing.

Autorevolvers chambered in .44 Magnum can have the recoil spring swapped out to effectively cycle .44 Special, and .357 Magnum with .38 Special.

== See also ==
- Chiappa Rhino, also designed by Emilio Ghisoni, using many similar characteristics
- RSh-12
- Revolver cannon
- Webley-Fosbery, another autorevolver design
