= Union Automatic Revolver =

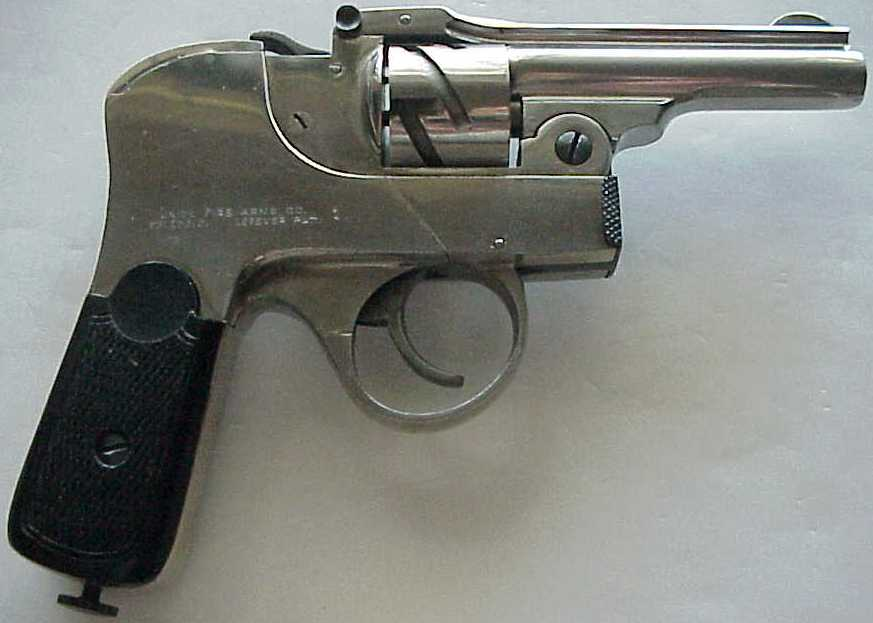
- Type: Automatic revolver
- Place of origin: United States

Production history
- Designed: 1909
- Manufacturer: Union Firearms Company
- Produced: 1909–1912
- No. built: limited

Specifications
- Cartridge: .32 S&W
- Action: Recoil operated semi-automatic revolver
- Rate of fire: Semi-automatic
- Sights: Iron

The Union automatic revolver (also known as the Lefever revolver) was a .32 caliber revolver. It was designed by Charles F. Lefever (U.S. patent 944,448, 1909) and manufactured by the Union Firearms Company of Toledo, Ohio.

It was produced in limited numbers until 1912 when production ceased, marking the exit of Union Firearms Company from the handgun business.

It was similar in action to the Webley Fosbery automatic revolver, but had a shroud that protected the recoiling upper half from contact with the firer's hand.

Before its demise, Union Firearms also manufactured the Riefgraber automatic pistol, patented by J.J. Riefgraber, on which Lefever also had "done some work". Charles F. Lefever later worked for the Daisy company in Plymouth, Michigan, for which he designed the Daisy Model 25, which sold over 15 million pieces by 1957.

== See also ==
- Lefever Arms Company
