= Chiappa Rhino =

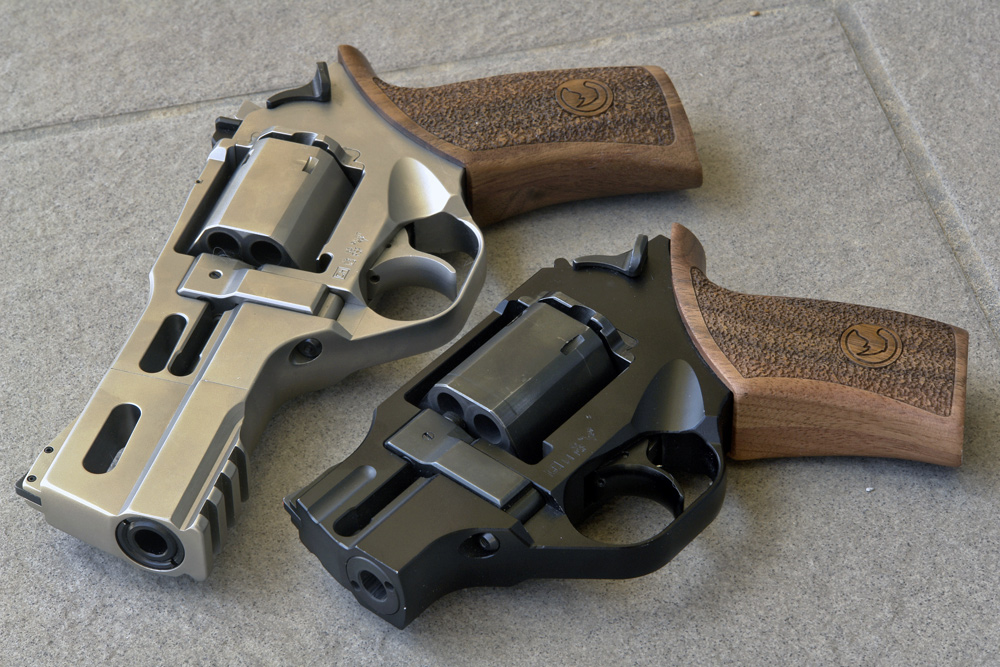
- Chiappa Rhino 40DS and 20D
- Type: Revolver
- Place of origin: Italy

Production history
- Designer: Emilio Ghisoni & Antonio Cudazzo
- Designed: 2008
- Manufacturer: Chiappa Firearms
- Unit cost: $775–1652 MSRP (depending on version)
- Produced: 2010–present
- Variants: 20D, 20DS, 30DS, 40DS, 50DS, 60DS, 60DS Charging Rhino (competition version for 9×19mm), 120DS (UK legal Long Barrel Revolver version); All variants in Black or Hard Chrome finish. Charging Rhino version only in Black.

Specifications
- Mass: 20D/20DS: 700 g (24.7 oz); 30DS: 771 g (27.2 oz); 40DS: 850 g (30 oz); 50DS: 895 g (31.6 oz); 60DS/60DS Charging Rhino: 936 g (33 oz); 120DS: 1155 g (40.7 oz)
- Length: 20D/20DS: 164 mm (6.5 in); 30DS: 190 mm (7.5 in); 40DS: 215 mm (8.5 in); 50DS: 241 mm (9.5 in); 60DS/60DS Charging Rhino: 267 mm (10.5 in); 120DS: 622 mm (24.5 in)
- Barrel length: 20D/20DS: 51 mm (2.0 in); 30DS: 76 mm (3.0 in); 40DS: 102 mm (4.0 in); 50DS: 127 mm (5.0 in); 60DS/60DS Charging Rhino: 152 mm (6.0 in); 120DS: 304 mm (12.0 in)
- Cartridge: .357 Magnum/.38 Special; 9×19mm Parabellum; .40 S&W; 9×21mm
- Action: DA/SA, DAO or SAO revolver
- Feed system: 6-round hexagonal cylinder
- Sights: Fixed open sights

The Chiappa Rhino is a series of revolvers produced by Italian manufacturer Chiappa Firearms. The Rhino's frames are CNC-machined from a solid block of high-tensile aluminium alloy and all internal parts are CNC-machined from steel.

Chambered for the .357 Magnum/.38 Special, 9mm Parabellum, .40 S&W, or 9×21mm cartridges, their most distinctive feature is that the barrel is on a much lower bore axis, as the Rhino fires from the lowermost chamber of the cylinder rather than from the topmost chamber as in conventional revolvers.

== Design details ==
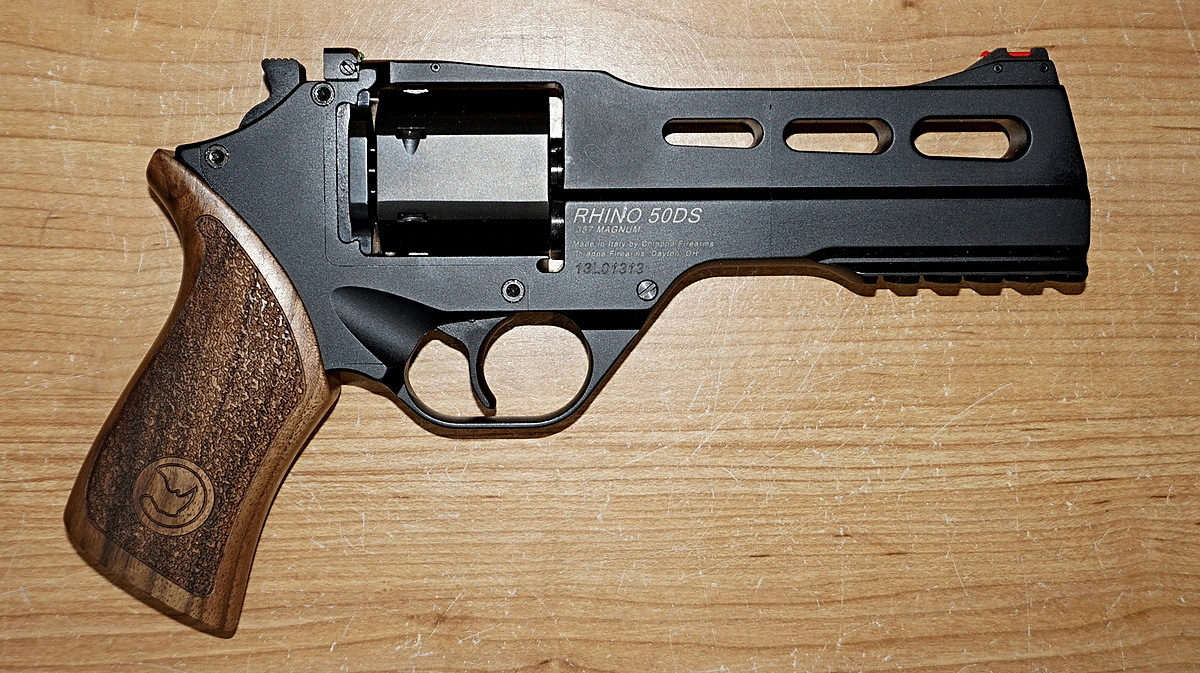
Chiappa Rhino 50DS .357 Magnum (5 inch barrel)

Designed by Emilio Ghisoni and Antonio Cudazzo, the Rhino differs from traditional revolvers in a number of ways. Stylistically it resembles Ghisoni's earlier design, the Mateba Autorevolver, and was his last design before his death in 2008.

In order to reduce weight, the frame of the Rhino is made of Ergal (an aluminium alloy), and the receiver is CNC-machined from a solid block of high-tensile aluminium. Virtually all components are CNC-machined as well; this manufacturing process yields a very precise fit with minimal tolerances. For models other than the 20D, the trigger may be used in either single-action or double-action mode. Only the 2-inch 20D model comes in double-action only.

The external cocking lever is not actually a hammer as on most revolvers. Instead, it is merely a linkage handle used to cock an internal hammer, and immediately falls back into place after cocking is complete, minimizing the number of externally moving parts and reciprocating mass. An additional feature of this gun is, unlike most revolvers, it comes with an accessory rail (except for the 2-inch and 3-inch models), on which tactical lights and laser sights can be mounted. The aluminium-based revolver is available in anodized finishes resembling traditional bluing, as well as a version resembling electroless nickel finish referred as the "White Rhino". A gold-colored version was displayed at the 2014 SHOT Show.

Firing from the lowermost chamber in the cylinder as opposed to the uppermost is intended to reduce muzzle flip by aligning the recoil more into the shooter's wrist, rather than above it. A downside of this design is that it increases the vertical distance between the sight line and the bore axis (sight height), meaning the gun will have a greater parallax error when aiming at close range. Another distinctive feature is that the cross-section of its cylinder is hexagonal (though with rounded corners) instead of circular; this is intended to narrow the weapon's profile in concealed carry applications.

Chiappa Rhino DS 60 Stormhunter (.357 Mag)

== Variants ==
Chiappa manufactures the Rhino in a number of sizes, barrel lengths, finishes, and calibers, including a frame that is made from polymer instead of aluminum.

- POLYLITE 20DS with a polymer frame
- 20D (double-action only 2-inch barrel)
- 20DS (double-action/single-action 2-inch barrel)
- 30DS (double-action/single-action 3-inch barrel)
- 40DS (double-action/single-action 4-inch barrel)
- 50DS (double-action/single-action 5-inch barrel)
- 60DS (double-action/single-action 6-inch barrel)
- 120DS (double-action/single-action 12inch barrel with a "coat hanger" counter weight attached to the grip to comply with UK firearms law to extend the length to a minimum 60 cm, produced in .357 Magnum/.38 Special and 9mm Parabellum)

== See also ==
- Mateba Autorevolver
- RSh-12
