= Mateba =

Italian firearms manufacturer

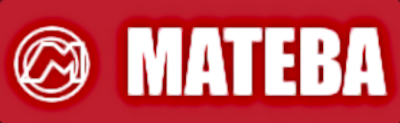

Mateba, a contraction of the Italian words Macchine Termo-Balistiche (Thermo-Ballistic Machines), was an Italian machine manufacturer based in Pavia, Italy. It is better known for its low-barrelled revolver pistols that it produced under the leadership of Emilio Ghisoni. After a change in ownership and poor sales, the Mateba company closed in 2005, but reopened in 2014 in Montebelluna under the ownership of Domenico Libro. In 2022 this latest incarnation of Mateba was shut down, owing to allegations of fraud and violations of Italian firearms law.

== Products ==
- MT1, .22long rifle semi-automatic sport pistol
- MTR Series - (MTR equals Ma Teba Revolver) family of double/single action all-steel revolvers in which Ghisoni placed the barrel as low as possible with the cylinder in front of the triggerguard and using high-capacity cylinders. The MTR series were designed for Rapid Fire competition shooting, with barrel weights, and the low muzzle to minimize climb;
  - MTR-8 - 8 rounds of .38 caliber ammunition,
  - MTR-12 - 12 rounds of .32 caliber ammunition,
  - MTR-14 - 14 rounds of .22LR.
- 2006M - 6 rounds of .357/.38 caliber ammunition
- Model 6 Unica (generally known simply as the Mateba or the Mateba Autorevolver), available in .357 magnum, .41 magnum, .44 magnum, and .454 Casull.
- Grifone Carbine- 18 inch barrel version of the Model 6 Unica in two versions:
  - one with wood furniture finishes, overfolding barrel and in .357-Magnum,
  - with fixed stock, stainless steel and wooden finishes, and in .44-Remington Magnum.

== Gallery ==
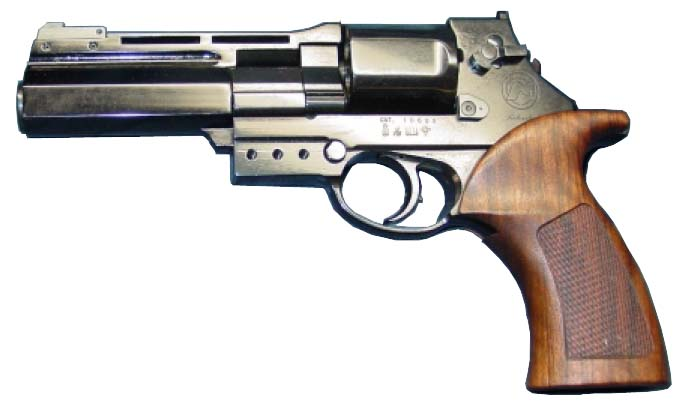
Mateba Model 6 Unica (Dynamic Sportiva).

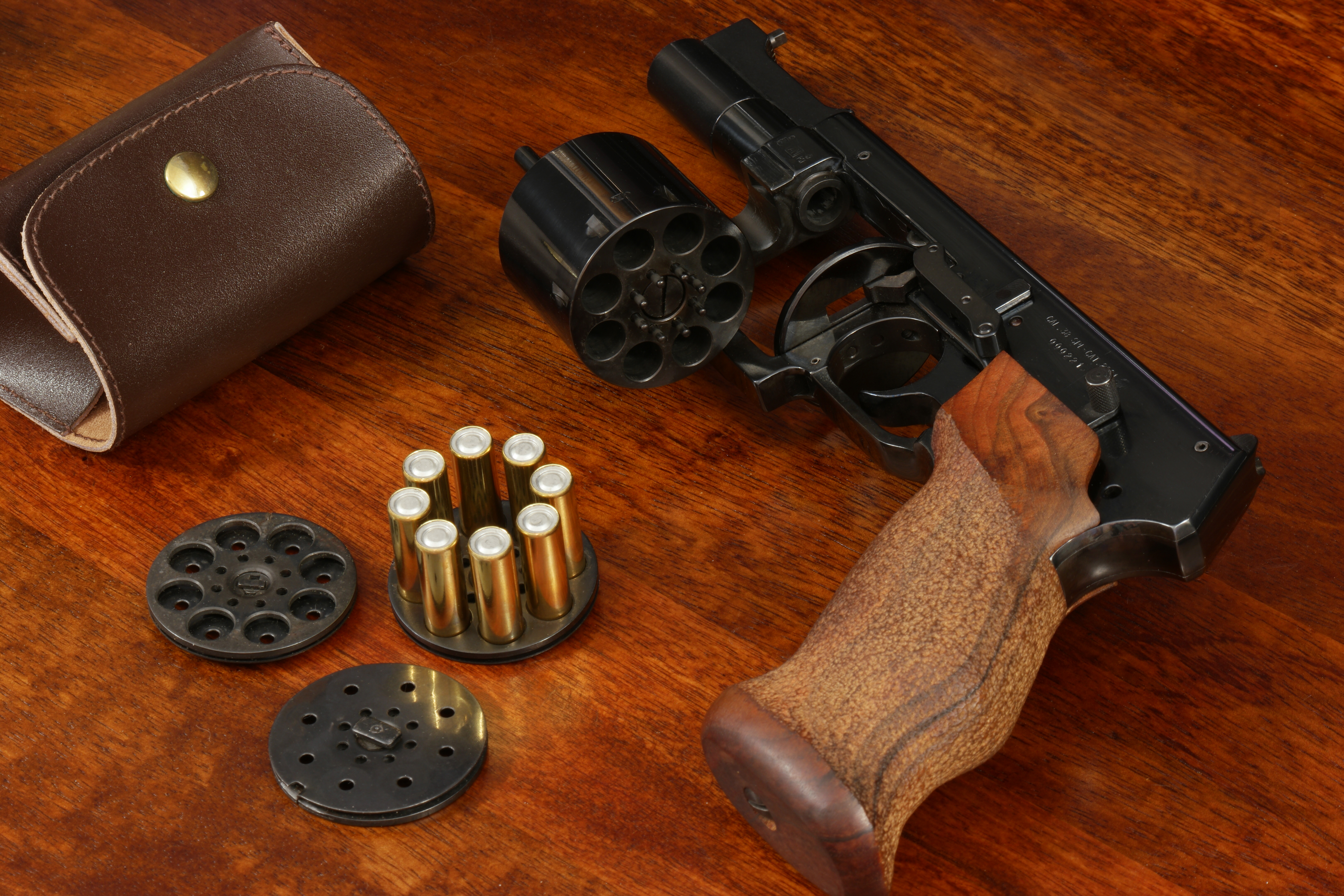
Mateba MTR-8.

== See also ==
- Chiappa Rhino - Designed by Emilio Ghisoni but built by Chiappa Firearms
