= 12.7×55mm STs-130 =

Russian military subsonic intermediate rifle cartridge

12.7×55mm
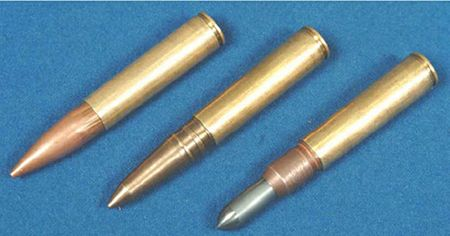
- From left to right, STs-130PT (sniper), STs-130PT2 (sniper with solid bronze bullet), STs-130VPS (high penetration / armor piercing).
- Type: Rifle
- Place of origin: Russian Federation

Production history
- Designed: 2002

Specifications
- Parent case: .338 Lapua Magnum
- Bullet diameter: 13.01 mm (0.512 in)
- Shoulder diameter: 13.76 mm (0.542 in)
- Base diameter: 14.86 mm (0.585 in)
- Case length: 54.91 mm (2.162 in)
- Overall length: STs-130 - 97.3 mm (3.83 in); PS-12 - 73 mm (2.9 in)

Ballistic performance
Bullet mass/type	Velocity	Energy
59 g (911 gr) STs130PT	295 m/s (970 ft/s)	2,567 J (1,893 ft⋅lbf)
48.2 g (744 gr) STs130PT2	295 m/s (970 ft/s)	2,097 J (1,547 ft⋅lbf)
76 g (1,173 gr) STs130VPS	295 m/s (970 ft/s)	3,307 J (2,439 ft⋅lbf)
33 g (509 gr) PS-12	300 m/s (980 ft/s)	1,485 J (1,095 ft⋅lbf)
17.94 g (277 gr) PS-12B	300 m/s (980 ft/s)	807.3 J (595.4 ft⋅lbf)

The 12.7×55mm cartridge is used in some Russian firearms such as the VKS bullpup sniper rifle, the ShAK-12 bullpup battle rifle and the RSh-12 revolver. The cartridge can carry a projectile weighing between 108 grains and 1173 grains and is predominantly used to fire heavy subsonic loads. The high penetration VKS round can penetrate up to 16 mm (0.63 in) of steel at 200 metres (220 yd) or body armor up to GOST 5A or NIJ III at 100 metres (110 yd). The accuracy of this cartridge when loaded with precision VKS bullets is claimed to be one MOA at 100 metres (110 yd) up to the effective range limit of 690 metres (750 yd).

Despite being chambered in the same cartridge, the ShAK-12 (and RSh-12) would not be able to feed or chamber rounds designed for the VKS due to significant length differences in the bullet component of the cartridge and thus requires its own, shorter, loads. The ShAK-12 rounds have less range compared to the VKS with the maximum effective range of the loads reaching in between 100 and 300 metres (110 and 330 yd).

== Cartridge variants for use in the VKS ==
- STs-130 (СЦ-130) - standard
- STs-130PU (СЦ-130ПУ) - for training
- STs-130PT (СЦ-130ПТ) - increased accuracy (59 gram bullet)
- STs-130PT2 (СЦ-130ПТ2) - increased accuracy (solid bronze bullet)
- STs-130VPS (СЦ-130ВПС) - increased penetration (76 gram bullet)

The MTs-558 carbine, a civilian version of the VKS, is also designed for this full-length variant.

== Cartridge variants for use in the ShAK-12 and RSh-12 ==
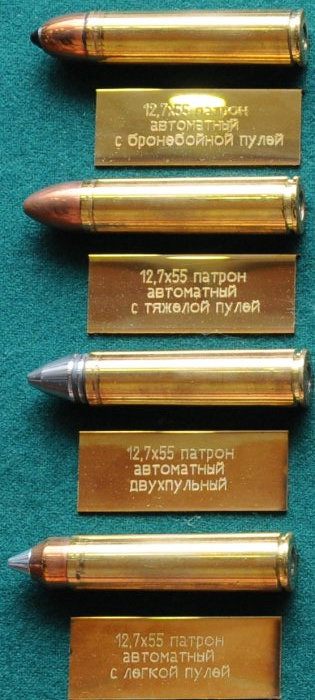
From left to right, light bullet, double-bulleted, heavy bullet, and armor-piercing bullet

- PS-12 [ПС-12] Tyazhelaya Pulya (TP) or "Heavy Bullet" - Heavy subsonic lead bullet weighing 33 grams (509 grains).
- PS-12A [ПС-12А] Legkaya Pulya (LP) or "Light Bullet" - Light supersonic lead bullet with an aluminum core weighing 7 grams (108 grains).
- PS-12B [ПС-12Б] Broneboynaya Pulya (BP) or "Armor-Piercing Bullet" - Lead bullet with an armor-piercing component weighing nearly 18 grams (277 grains).
- PD-12 [ПД-12] Dvukhpul'niy (DP) or "Double-Bulleted" - Two bullets loaded inline weighing 17 grams (262 grains) each.
- STs-174 [СЦ-174]: civilian hunting load. Case headstamped 12.7x55 МЦ. For revolver carbine MTs-569, a civilian hunting version of the RSh-12.

== See also ==
- Thumper concept
- Whisper (cartridge family)
- List of AR platform cartridges
- List of rifle cartridges
- 12 mm caliber
- 8.6 Blackout
- .375 SOCOM
- .45-70 Government
- .45 Raptor
- .450 Bushmaster
- .458 SOCOM
- .458 Winchester Magnum
- .50 Beowulf
- .50 Alaskan
- .500 Auto Max
- .510 Whisper
