= Webley–Fosbery Automatic Revolver =

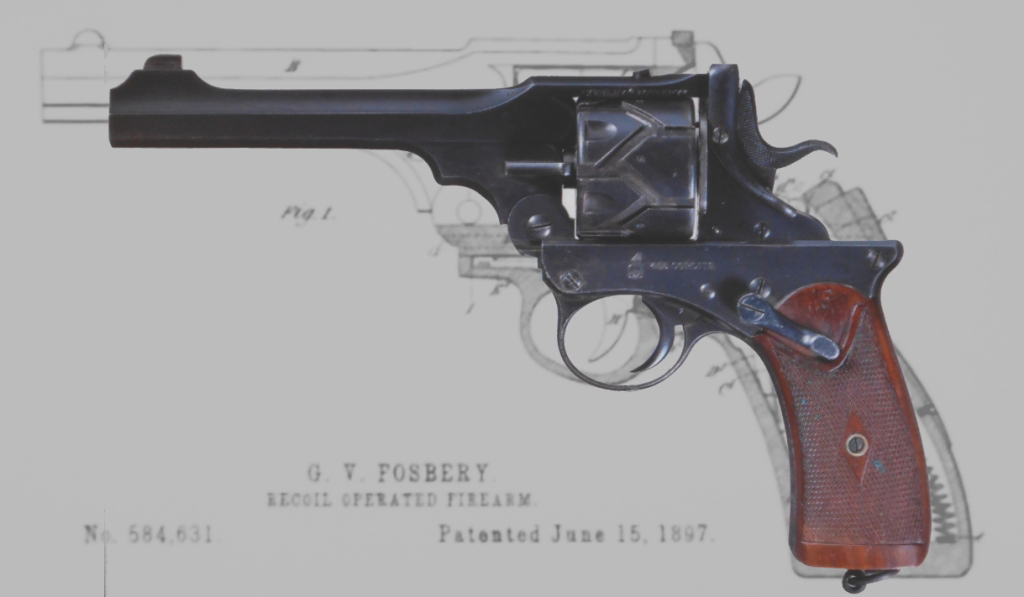
- Webley–Fosbery Automatic Revolver
- Type: Semi-automatic revolver
- Place of origin: United Kingdom

Production history
- Designer: George V. Fosbery
- Designed: 1895
- Manufacturer: Webley & Scott
- Produced: 1901–1924
- No. built: Approximately 4,750
- Variants: .455 Webley (Six-shot) and .38 ACP (Eight-shot)

Specifications
- Mass: 1.24 kg (2.17 lbs.) unloaded
- Length: 280 mm (11")
- Cartridge: .455 Webley Mk II.38 ACP
- Calibre: 0.455 in (11.6 mm); 0.38 in (9.7 mm)
- Action: Recoil operation
- Muzzle velocity: 620 ft/s (190 m/s)
- Feed system: Six-round cylinder (.455 Webley); Eight-round cylinder (.38 ACP)
- Sights: Blade (front), U-notch (rear)

The Webley–Fosbery Self-Cocking Automatic Revolver is a recoil-operated automatic revolver designed by George Vincent Fosbery and produced by the Webley & Scott company from 1901 to 1924. The revolver is easily recognisable by the zig-zag grooves on the cylinder. The handgun was offered in both .455 and .38 calibres and, somewhat unique for a revolver, features a manual thumb safety.

== History ==
Semi-automatic pistols were just beginning to appear when Fosbery devised a revolver that cocked the hammer and rotated the cylinder by sliding the action, cylinder and barrel assembly back on the frame. The prototype was a modified Colt Single Action Army revolver. However, Colt was uninterested in the automatic design. Fosbery patented his invention 16 August 1895 and further improvements were patented in June and October 1896.

Fosbery took his design to P. Webley & Son of Birmingham. P. Webley & Son, which merged with W.C. Scott & Sons and Richard Ellis & Son in 1897 to form the Webley & Scott Revolver and Arms Co., was the primary manufacturer of service pistols for the British Army as well as producing firearms for civilian use. Webley further developed the design and the Webley–Fosbery Automatic Revolver was introduced at the matches at Bisley in July 1900.

In civilian use, the Webley–Fosbery was popular with target shooters. Because the trigger mechanism did not rotate the cylinder, shots were smooth and consistent, permitting rapid and accurate shooting. Walter Winans, a famous contemporary target shooter, preferred the Webley–Fosbery, and in 1902 he used it to place six shots in a two-inch (5.1 cm) bull's-eye at 12 paces in seven seconds. Using a Prideaux speedloader he was able to fire twelve shots into a three-inch (7.6 cm) bull's-eye in approximately 15 seconds.

=== Wartime usage ===
Though Webley viewed this weapon as an ideal sidearm for cavalry troops, the Webley–Fosbery was never adopted as an official government sidearm. At over 11 inches (28 cm) long and weighing some 44 ounces (1,239 grammes) unloaded, the Webley–Fosbery was a heavy and unwieldy sidearm even by the standards of the day. Several models of Webley–Fosbery revolvers were produced, and the type saw limited action in the Boer Wars as well as World War I, where some privately purchased examples were carried by British officers in the .455 service chambering. Reports from the field suggested that the Webley–Fosbery, with its precisely machined recoil surfaces, was more susceptible to jamming in wartime conditions of mud and rain than comparable sidearms of the period. It has been commonly alleged that the Webley–Fosbery required a tight hold in order for the cylinder to properly cycle and cock the weapon.

Production ceased in 1924, with a total production of less than 5,000. Many revolvers remained unsold, and the model was carried in Webley's catalogues as late as 1939.

== In popular culture ==
A Webley–Fosbery figures prominently in the 1941 picture The Maltese Falcon, starring Humphrey Bogart and Mary Astor.

It also features throughout the 1974 film Zardoz, as the main sidearm of the central character Zed, played by Sean Connery.

== Gallery ==
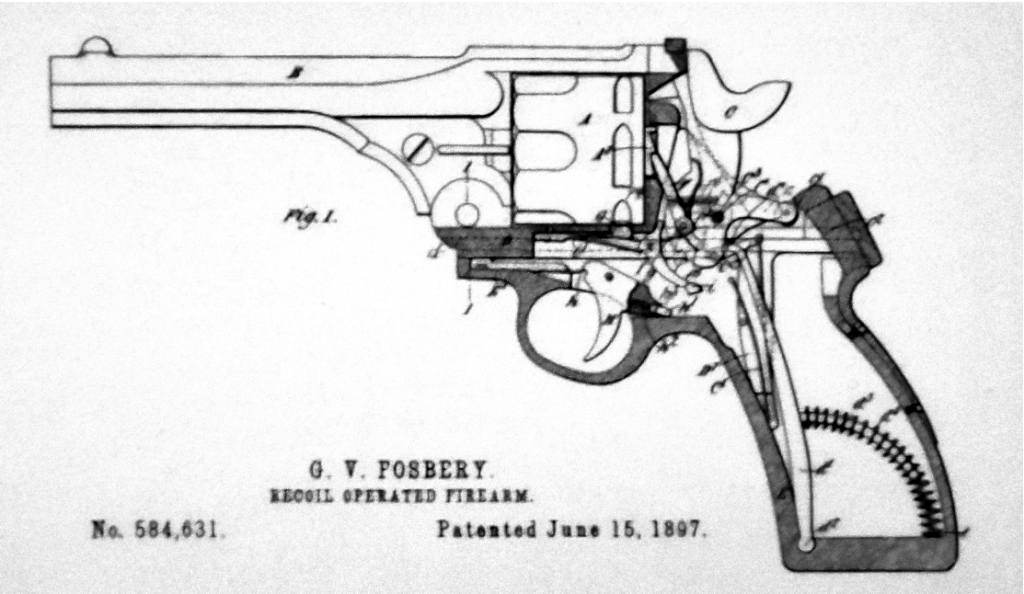
Webley-Fosbery patent 1897

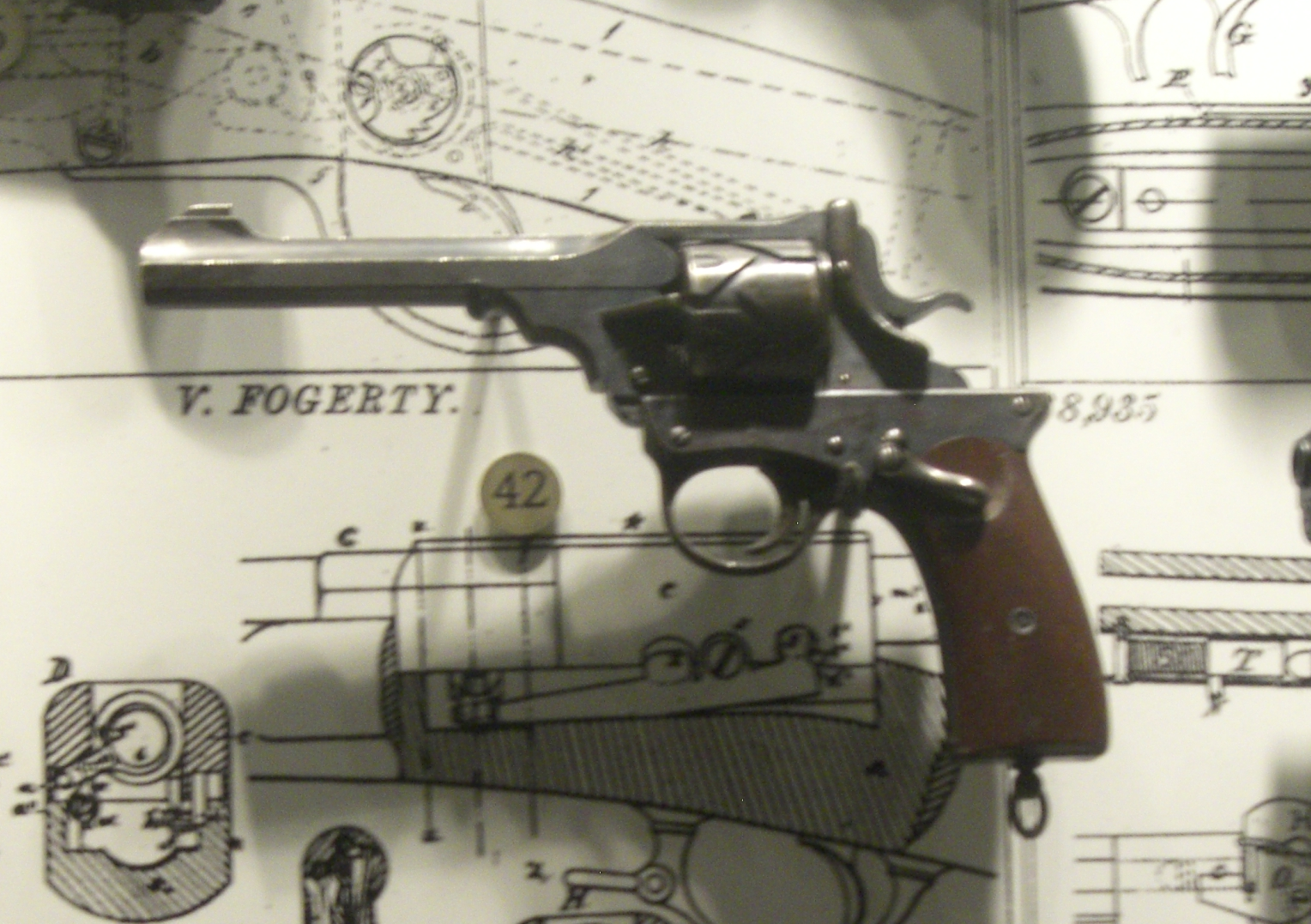
Webley-Fosbery .455

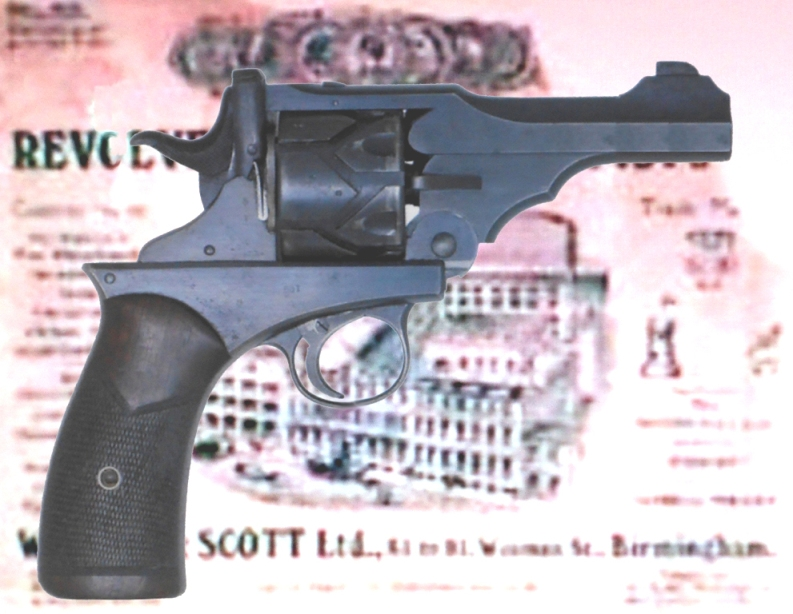
Webley-Fosbery .455, short-barreled variant

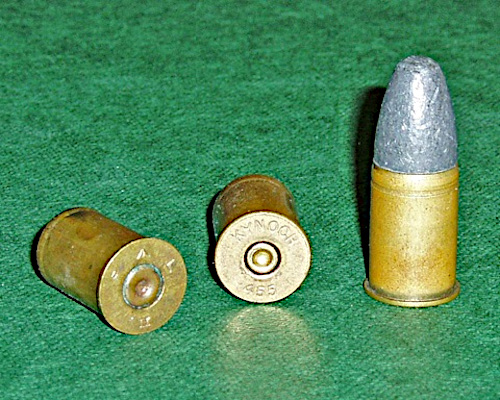
.455 SAA Ball ammunition

== See also ==
- Mateba Autorevolver, a modern automatic revolver
- Mauser M78, a revolver from the same era, with a zig-zag grooved cylinder
- Pancor Jackhammer, a select-fire shotgun based on the action type
- Zulaica Automatic Revolver, a small-bore (.22LR) automatic revolver from the same era
