= Zulaica Automatic Revolver =

- Type: Revolver
- Place of origin: Spain

Production history
- Designed: 1905
- Manufacturer: M. Zulaica y Cia.

Specifications
- Cartridge: .22 Long Rifle
- Action: Blowback
- Feed system: 6-round cylinder

The Zulaica Automatic Revolver is an automatic revolver of Spanish origin. It was produced for a very short time. The weapon was fed from a six round cylinder and chambered in the .22 Long Rifle round.

== Overview ==
M. Zulaica y Cia., Eibar, Spain. began manufacturing 'Velo-Dog' type pocket revolvers in the early 1900s. In 1905, Zulaica patented an unusual automatic revolver silenced design, but few were ever manufactured and even fewer have survived.
