= VKS Vykhlop =

VKS
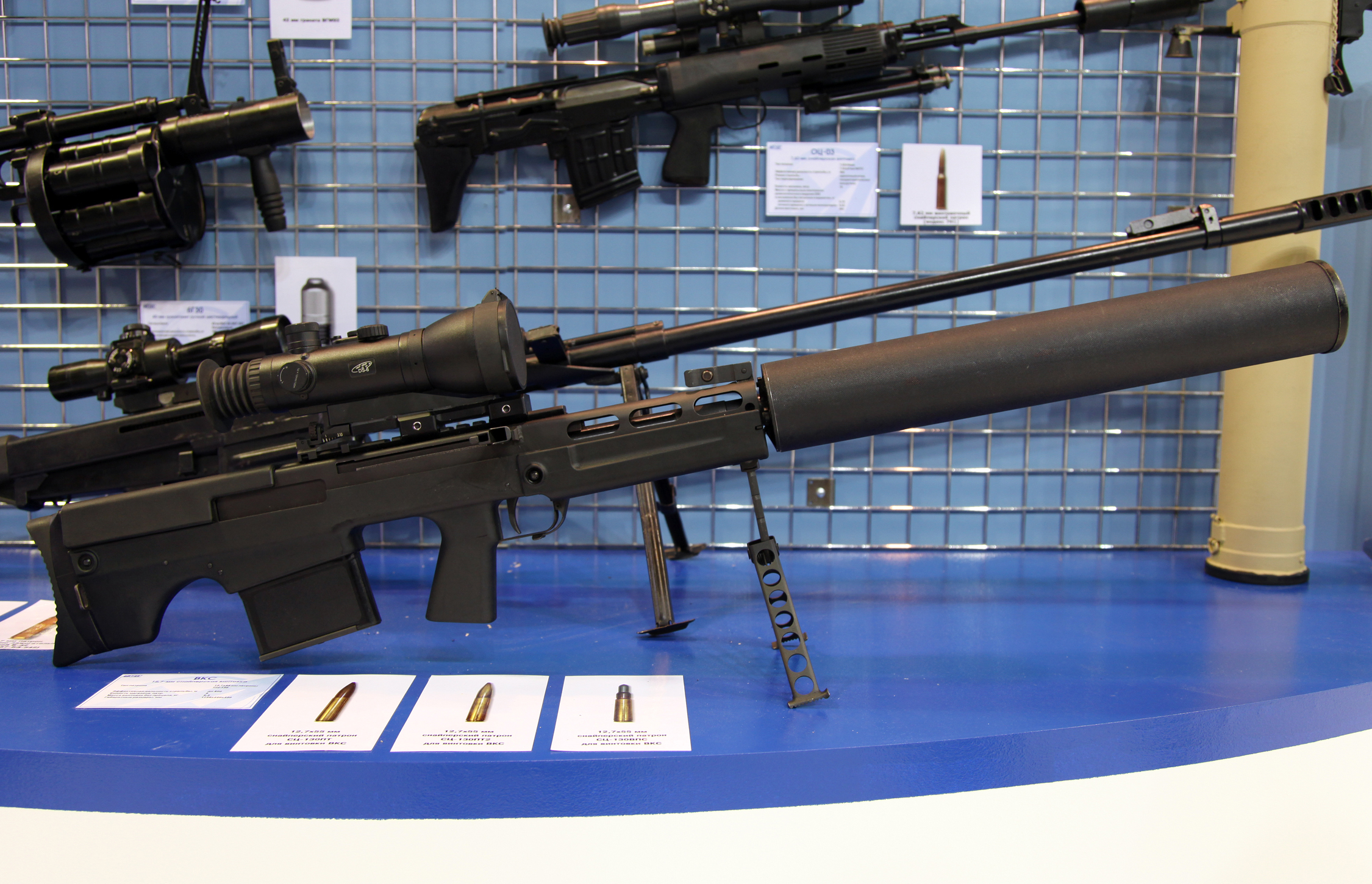
- The VKS sniper rifle
- Type: Bullpup sniper rifle
- Place of origin: Russia

Service history
- In service: 2004–present
- Used by: Federal Security Service of the Russian Federation
- Wars: Russo-Ukrainian war (2022–present)

Production history
- Designer: CKIB SOO (Central Design Bureau of Sporting and Hunting Weapons)
- Designed: 2002
- Manufacturer: CKIB SOO (Central Design Bureau of Sporting and Hunting Weapons)
- Produced: 2002

Specifications
- Mass: 7 kg (total weight)
- Length: 1120 mm (overall length with suppressor)
- Barrel length: 450 mm
- Width: 220 mm
- Height: 220 mm
- Cartridge: 12.7×55mm STs-130
- Action: Bolt-action
- Muzzle velocity: 300 m/s
- Effective firing range: 600 m
- Feed system: 5-round detachable box magazine
- Sights: Folding iron sights or telescopic sight, Picatinny rail available for various optics

VKS (ВКС) or VSSK (ВССК) is a Russian bullpup, straight pull, magazine-fed sniper rifle chambered for the 12.7×55mm STs-130 subsonic round. The weapon is also known by the name VSSK and the additional name Vykhlop (Выхлоп), "Exhaust", which comes from the development program. It was developed in around 2002 for the special force units of FSB. The VKS has also seen use in Ukraine during the Russo-Ukrainian war.

The 12.7×55mm VKS silenced sniper rifle is intended for special operations that require silent firing and penetration much superior to that provided by 9×39mm VSS silenced sniper rifle. Typical targets for the VKS are combatants in heavy body armor or behind cover. The weapon uses an integral suppressor.

== Design ==
The special round has an overall length of 97 mm. The accuracy is claimed as 1 minute of angle at a 100-meter range with precision bullets.

Cartridge variants:

- STs-130 (СЦ-130) - standard
- STs-130U (СЦ-130У) - for training
- STs-130PT (СЦ-130ПТ) - increased accuracy (59 gram bullet)
- STs-130PT2 (СЦ-130ПТ2) - increased accuracy (solid bronze bullet)
- STs-130VPS (СЦ-130ВПС) - increased penetration (76 gram bullet). Capable of penetrating 16 mm of steel at 200 meters, or body armor up to GOST 5 at 100 meters.
