= Muzzle rise =

Phenomenon in firearm dynamics

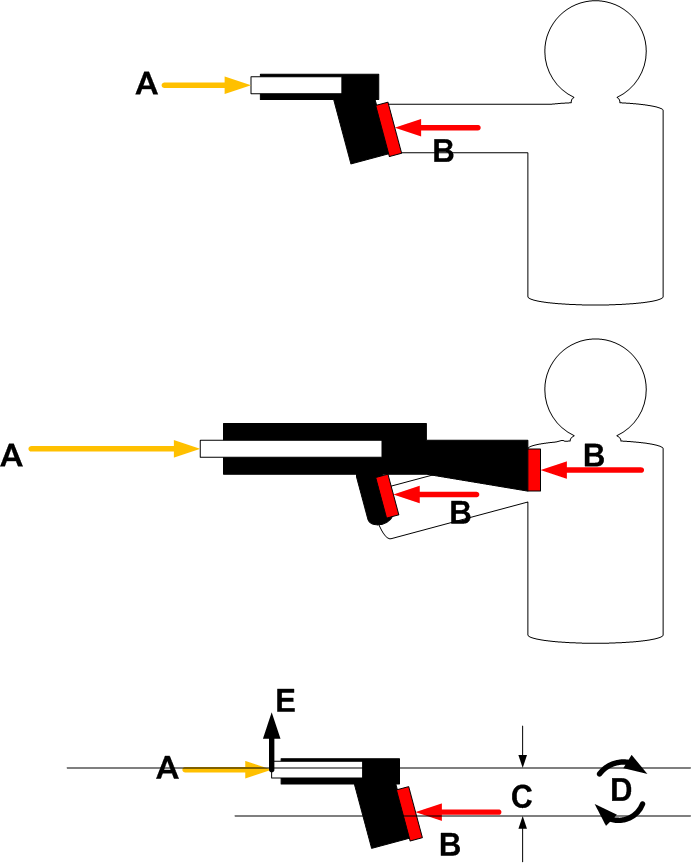
Illustration of forces in muzzle rise. Projectile and propellant gases act on barrel along barrel centerline A. Forces are resisted by shooter contact with gun at grips and stock B. Height difference between barrel centerline and average point of contact is height C. Forces A and B operating over moment arm / height C create torque or moment D, which rotates the firearm's muzzle up as illustrated at E.

Muzzle rise, muzzle flip or muzzle climb refers to the tendency of a firearm's or airgun's muzzle (front end of the barrel) to rise up after firing. It more specifically refers to the seemingly unpredictable "jump" of the firearm's muzzle, caused by combined recoil from multiple shots being fired in quick succession. It has an adverse effect on maintaining accuracy with using automatic weapons or rapid-firing semi-automatic firearms, as a moving muzzle can throw off the shooter's aim, causing subsequent shots to miss the intended target.

== Reason ==
The primary reason for muzzle rise is that for nearly all guns, the bore axis (longitudinal centerline of the barrel) is above the gun's center of mass, while the contact points between the shooter and the gun (e.g. grips and stock) are often all below the center of mass. When the gun is fired, the bullet motion and the escaping propellant gases exert a reactional recoil directly backwards along the bore axis, while the countering forward push from the shooter's hands and body are well below it. This creates a rotational couple, exerting a torque around the center of mass that causes the gun to pitch upwards, causing the muzzle to elevate.

Muzzle rise can be reduced, though generally only through trading off other qualities. Methods include

- adding more ergonomic contact points (such as a sling, an "inline"-style buttstock, or a foregrip), or employing a "thumb-over-bore" grip, for more efficient exertion of anti-recoil forces
- reducing the vertical distance between the barrel and the contact points
- lowering the recoil by using less powerful cartridges
- lowering the recoil by lowering the rate of fire of fully automatic weapons, or supplanting the full-auto mode with burst firing
- lowering the backward recoil with devices such as muzzle brakes, which vector away part of the overall recoil
- lowering the recoil with a suppressor, which slows down the escaping propellant gas and reduces the backward recoil force
- compensating for the couple using a recoil compensator, a ported barrel or other asymmetric muzzle fixtures, which vector some of the propellant gas upwards to create a reactional downward torque on the muzzle
- increasing the moment of inertia by attaching additional weight to the muzzle end; it is unusual to do this expressly, although a suppressor or compensator accomplishes it as a collateral effect
- increasing the rate of fire of burst-fired firearms to give the muzzle rise less time to affect the shot placements

== Designs ==
A number of firearms have been designed specifically to address the issue of muzzle rise. The Jatimatic submachine gun is an example of a firearm where the bore axis is inclined against the bolt and the rest of the firearm in order to redirect the recoil force slightly upwards. The KRISS Vector submachine gun uses a more elaborate mechanical articulated mechanism which allows the block and bolt to recoil not just rearward like most other firearms, but back and then 'vectored' down off-axis along a rail system behind the weapon's magazine well to reduce muzzle rise and felt recoil.

The Hudson H9, introduced in 2017, is based on the M1911 but has the recoil spring down in front of the trigger guard, resulting in a barrel very close to the top of the shooter's grip, with the creator claiming that, "the recoil impulse from that recoil spring is directed into the meat of your hand."

== Gallery ==
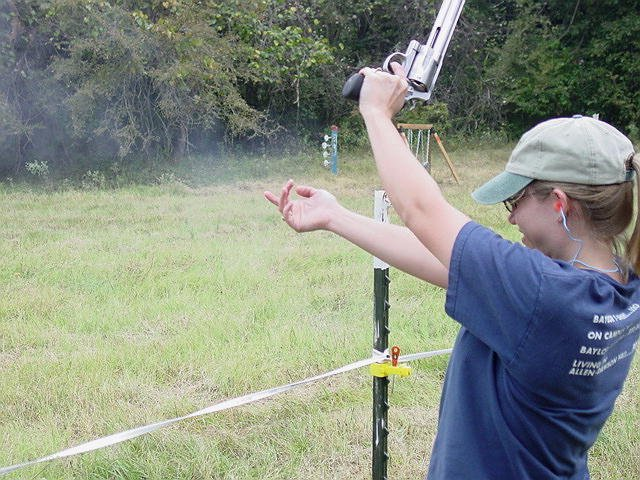
The recoil from the .500 S&W Magnum cartridge inducing significant muzzle rise during firing a Smith & Wesson Model 500 revolver.

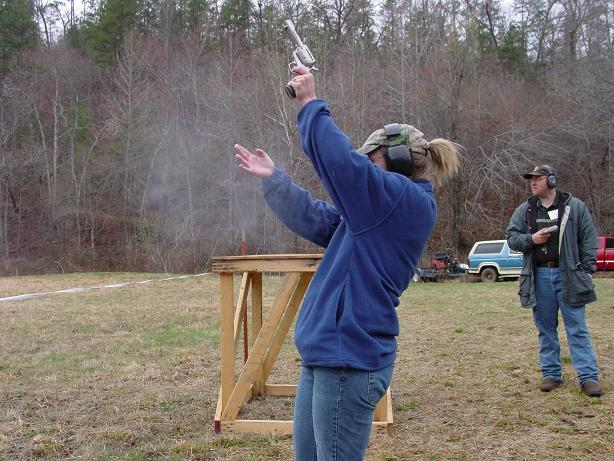
The recoil from the .500 Linebaugh cartridge inducing significant muzzle rise during firing a Ruger Bisley revolver.

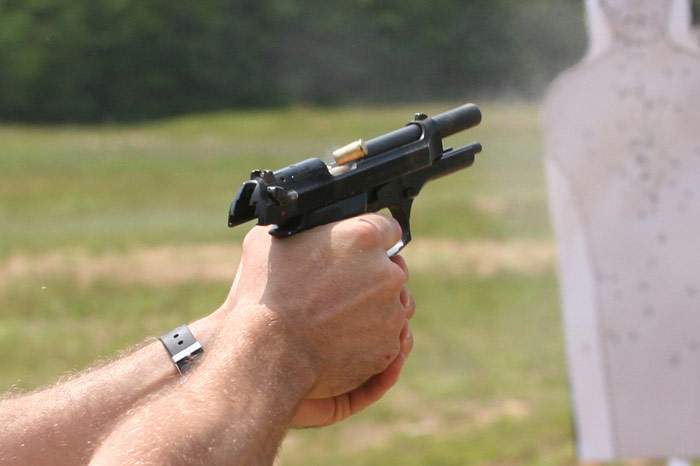
Beretta M9 semi-automatic pistol exhibiting muzzle rise just after firing a 9×19mm Parabellum cartridge.

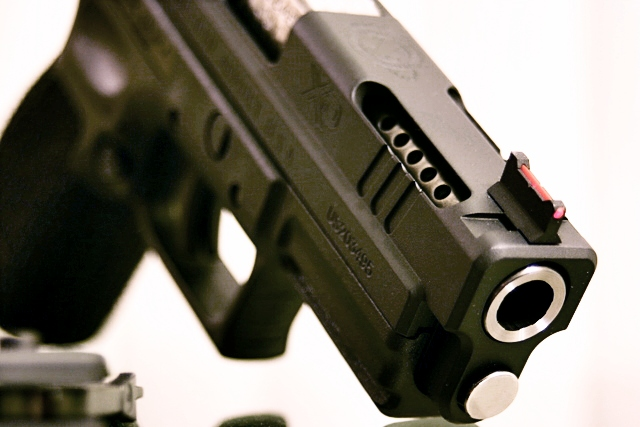
Springfield Armory, Inc., custom XD-40 V-10 with ported barrel and slide intended to reduce muzzle rise

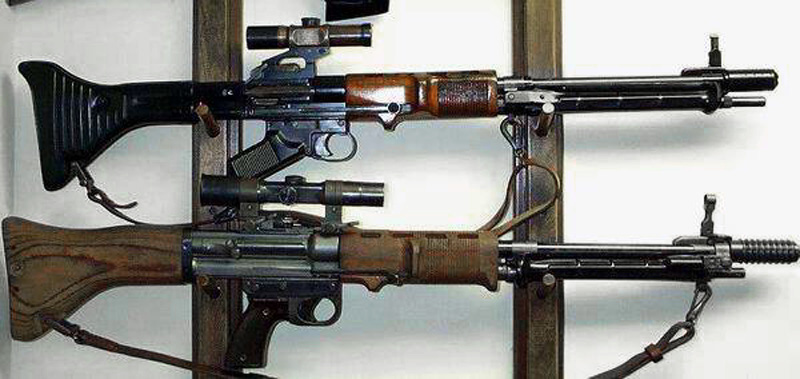
The FG 42 battle rifle/automatic rifle was one of the first inline fire arms incorporating a "straight-line" recoil configuration to reduce muzzle rise.

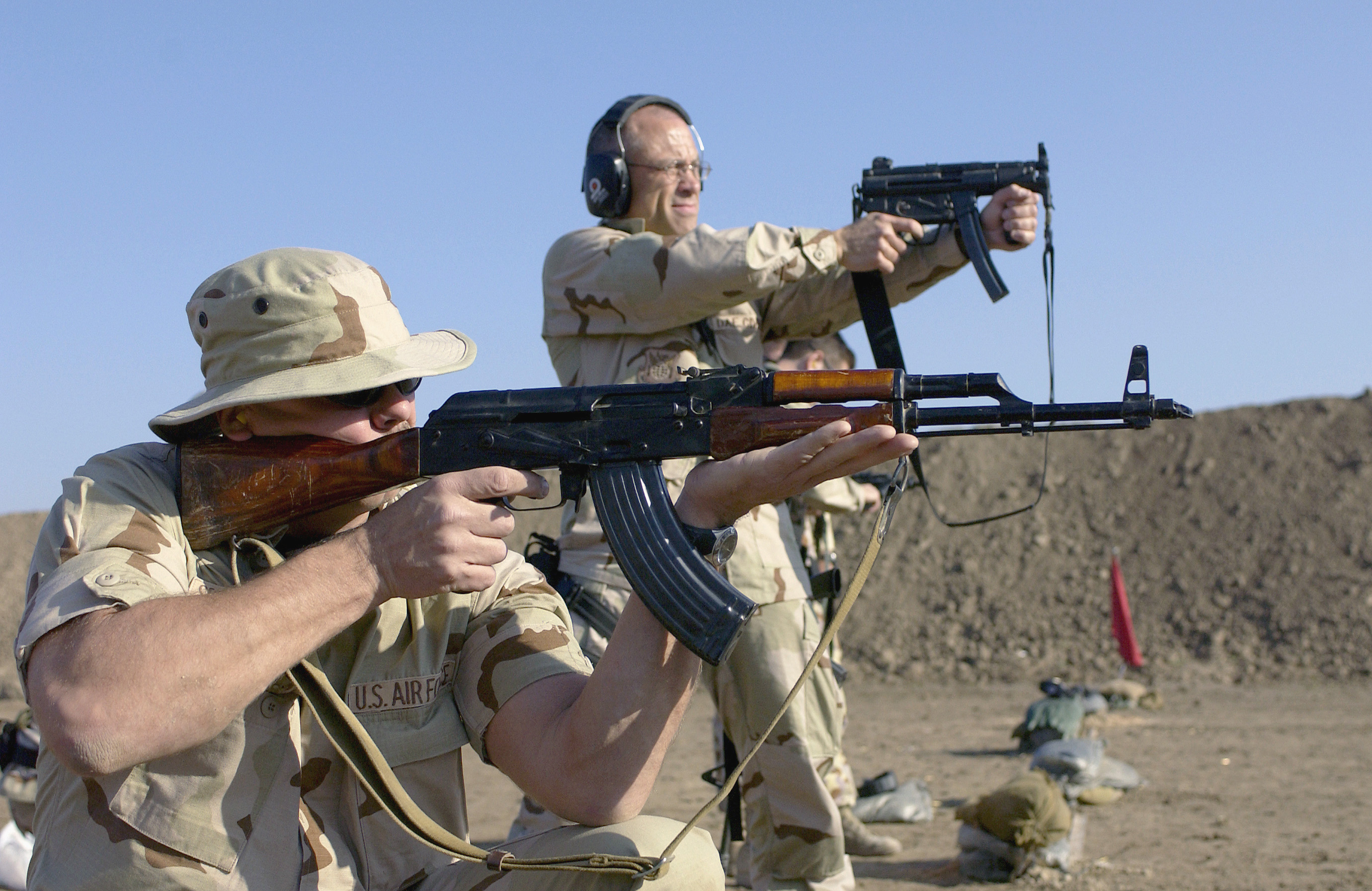
An AKM assault rifle asymmetric slant cut muzzle fixture designed to counteract muzzle rise (and muzzle climb) during (automatic) firing.

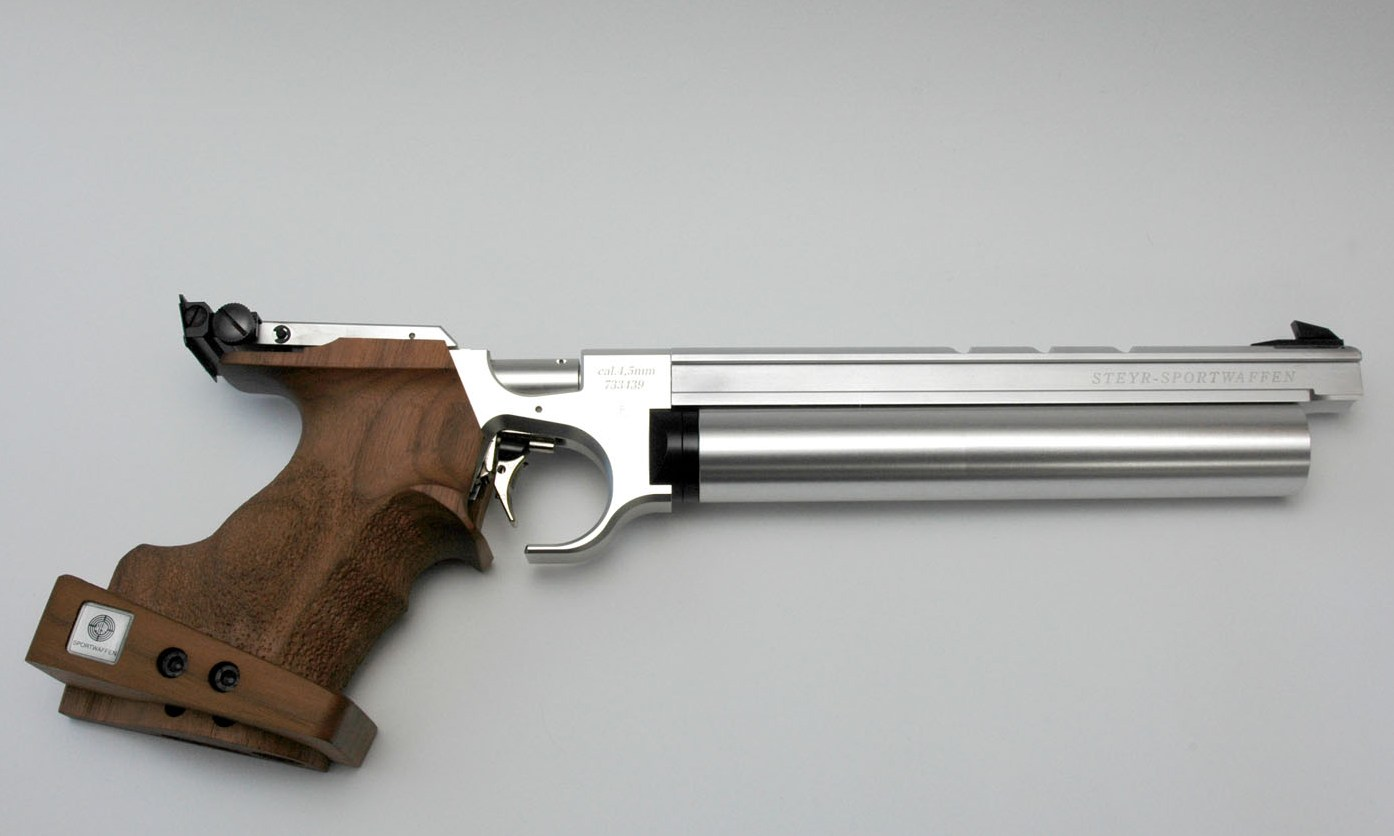
The barrel of the Steyr LP 10 PCP air pistol has three holes drilled on top along its length to counteract muzzle rise.
