= Bore axis =

Longitudinal axis through the center of a gun barrel

The bore axis of a firearm is the longitudinal axis through the geometric center of the gun barrel. In a rifled barrel, the projectile (bullet/ball, pellet or slug) will spin around the bore axis as it goes through the barrel.

Boresighting is a process of placing one's line of sight down along the bore axis.

== Bore-to-sight distance ==
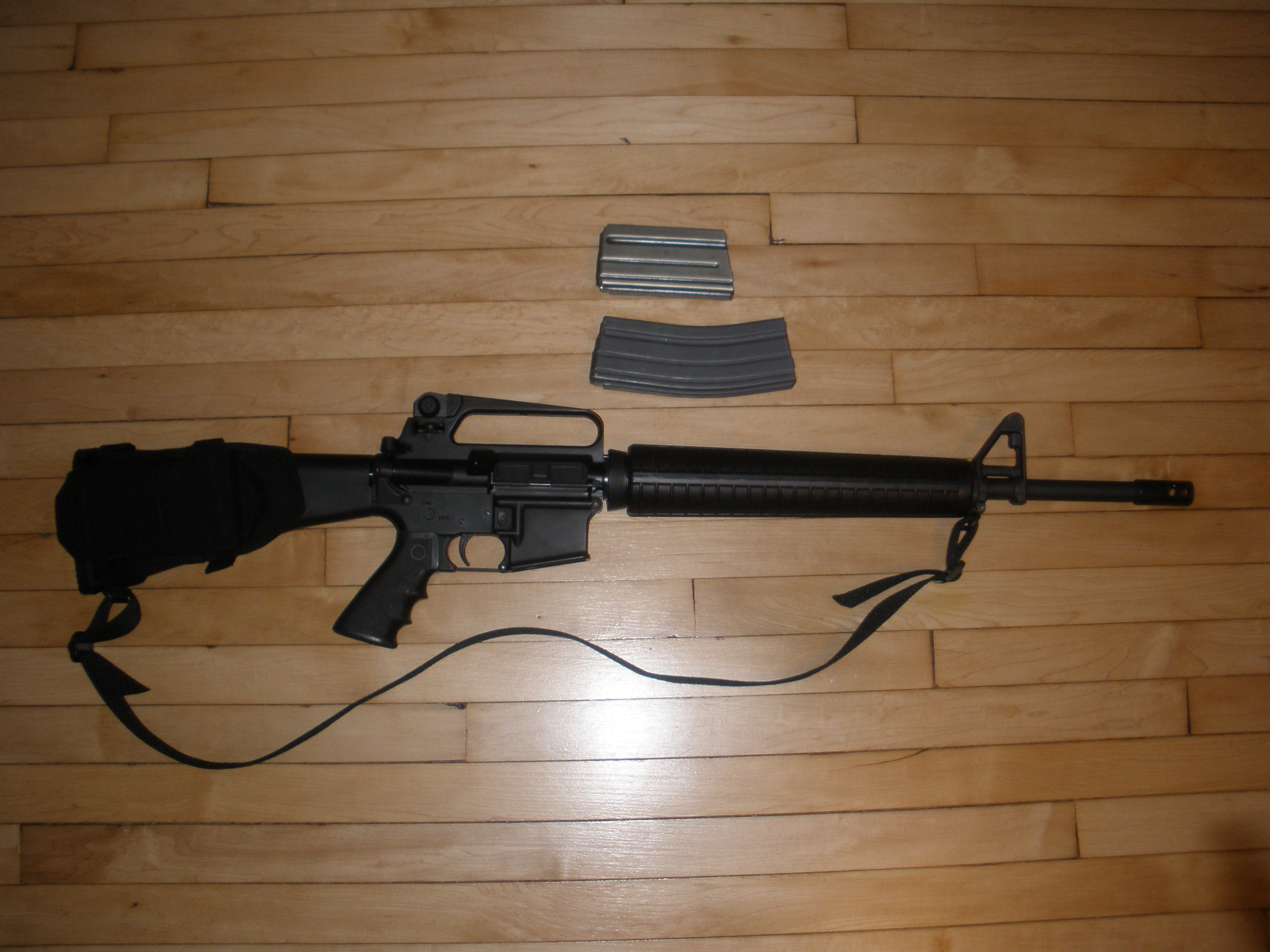
The AR-15 is an example of a weapon system where the sights are high over the bore.

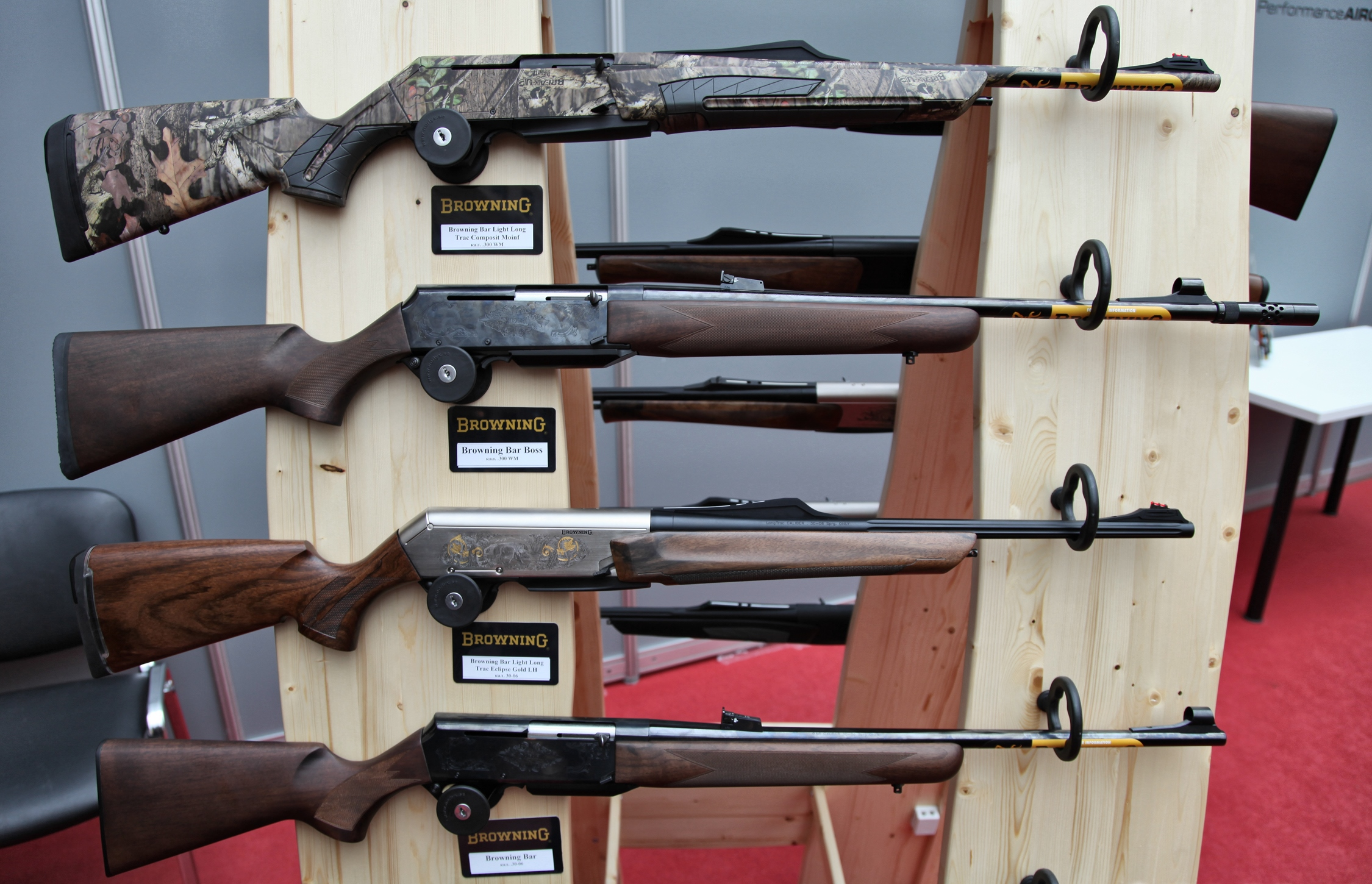
Browning BAR is an example of a weapon system where the sights sit low and close to the bore.

The distance between the bore axis and the sight axis (the optical axis of a sighting device), also known as the sight height, is an important factor to consider due to parallax principles. It is normally desirable to keep the sights of a firearm as close to the bore as possible, since a firearm with a large bore-to-sight distance will require more compensatory sight adjustment when shifting between shooting at different targets at close ranges (due to foreshortening). On the other hand, a firearm with a short bore-to-sight distance will need less sight adjustment when changing between targets at close ranges. At longer ranges the bore-to-sight distance will be of less importance, since gravity has affected the projectile so much that the height difference between the bore axis and the sight axis has far less impact compared to the bullet drop.

Traditional bolt hunting rifles usually have had the optical center of about 38 mm (1.5 in) above the bore, while AR-type rifles and modern bolt-action rifles usually have their optical center about 68 mm (2.7 in) above the bore.

On firearms with a picatinny rail, the distance from the bore to the optical axis can be divided into distance from bore axis to top of rail, and distance from top of rail to center of the optical axis. For example on an AR-type rifle, the mil-spec distance from center of bore to top of rail is 1.211 inches, or approximately 31 mm (1.2 in). The mount height itself, that is the distance from the top of rail to center of scope, varies, but typically lies around 36–38 mm (1.4–1.5 in) (higher and lower mounts are also readily available). In total, this gives a typical scoped AR-style rifle a height over bore of around 67–69 mm (2.6–2.7 in).

== Recoil control ==
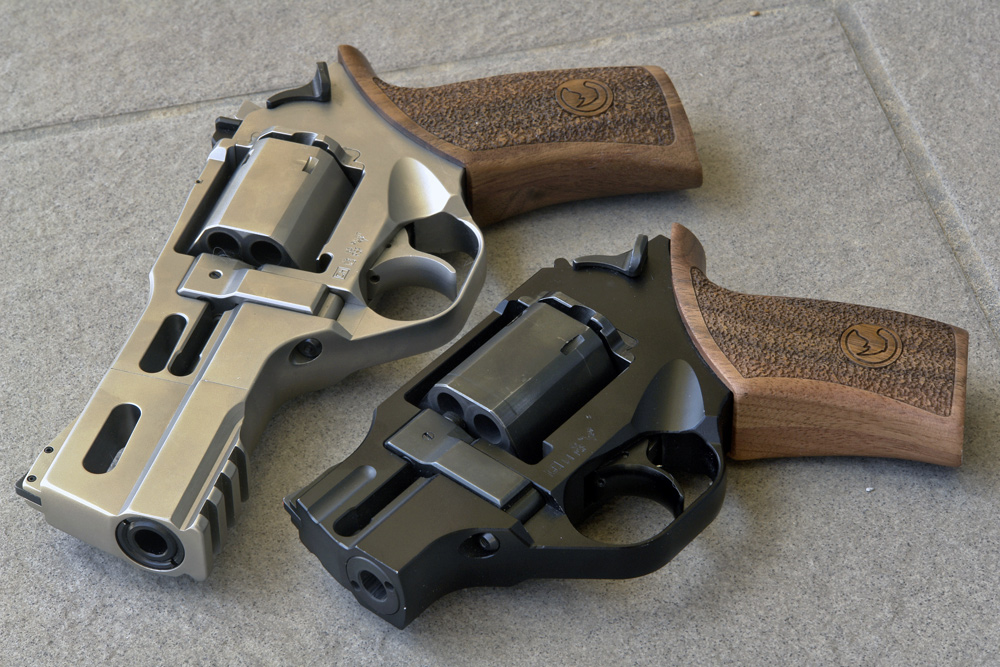
The Chiappa Rhino is an example of a pistol with a low bore axis.

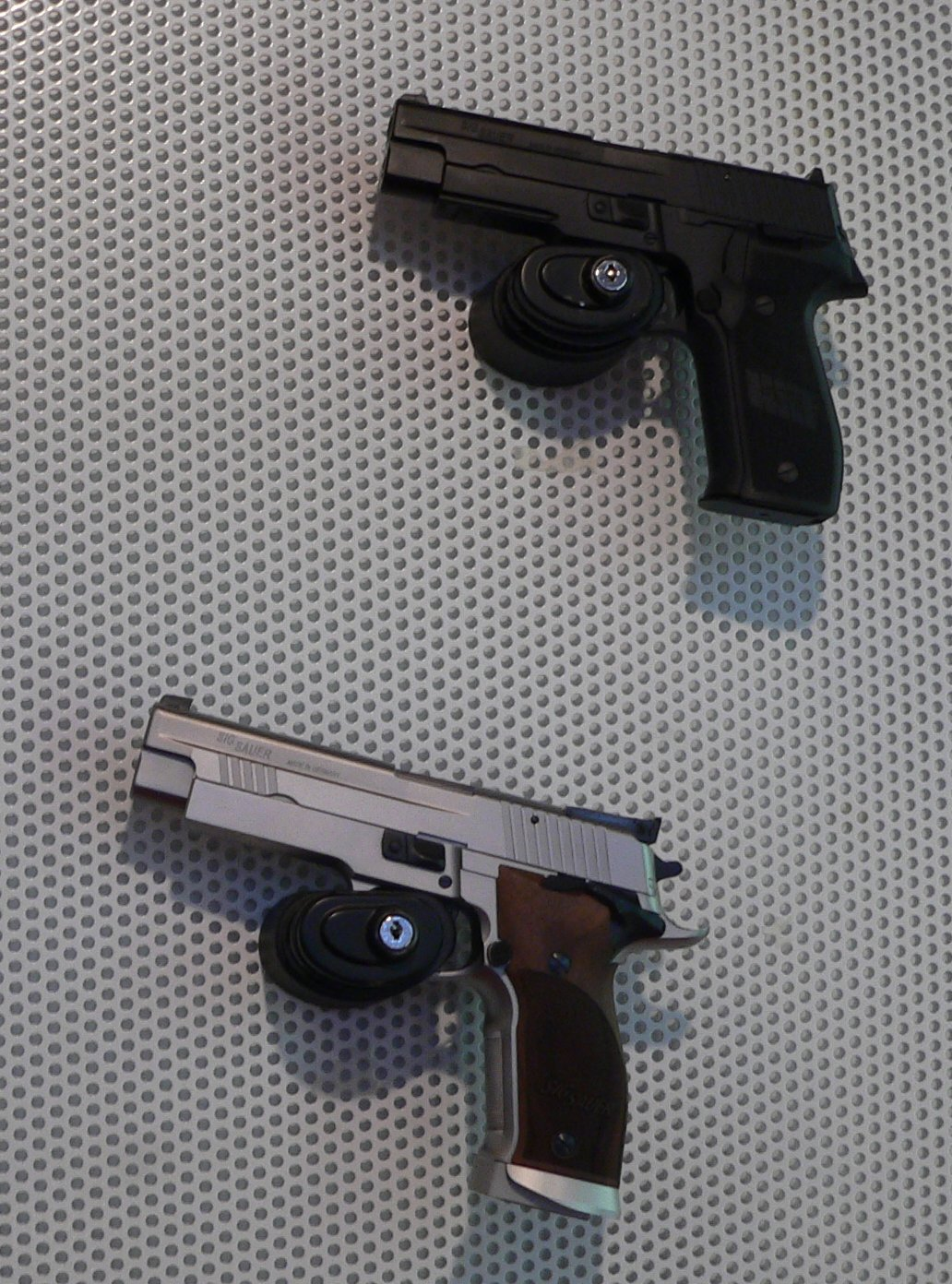
The SIG Sauer P226 is an example of a pistol with a high bore axis.

The recoil from a fired cartridge (and the action movement) exerts a rearward impulse along the bore axis, which is commonly above the center of mass of the gun. Meanwhile, the gripped areas of the gun, where the user will exert a reactional forward push countering the recoil, is almost always below the gun's center of mass. This force couple creates a rotational torque around the mass center and make the gun pitch upwards after each shot — a phenomenon known as muzzle rise. This is more prominent in shorter-barreled weapons such as handguns due to less frontal weight available to counter the upward lifting of the muzzle, and how high the bore axis sits above the gripping hand will also affect the degree of muzzle rise. A lower bore axis will align more of the recoil directly into the hand, creating less couple torque and thus less muzzle rise. Among other things that affect muzzle rise and felt recoil is the weight of the pistol frame and tuning of recoil springs. The presence of a buttstock in a long gun will also help negate the effect of muzzle rise by shifting the pivot of the muzzle rise back towards the butt end, thus utilizing the entire gun's weight with a longer lever to counter the rise.

== Bore axis in pistols ==
Handguns lack a buttstock to aid in recoil control, so design elements that reduce felt recoil or muzzle flip are considered highly desirable and numerous manufacturers claim their handgun design has a low bore axis, although few offer measurements to prove this claim. While a lower bore axis does typically yield reduced felt recoil and muzzle flip, shooters intent on reducing these features as much as possible (such as competitive sport shooters) will typically seek out handguns with heavy steel frames, as increasing the weight of the gun's non-reciprocating mass (the frame) yields greater reductions in felt recoil and muzzle flip than any difference in bore axis height can typically achieve. Handguns such as the CZ-75, which combine a heavy steel frame with a low bore axis (relative to other hammer-fired guns) achieve twofold reductions to felt recoil and muzzle flip, and are popular choices in many competitive shooting disciplines.

Striker-fired handgun designs are typically able to achieve a lower bore axis than their hammer-fired counterparts since strikers travel straight forward, rather than up and forward like a typical hammer mechanism.

One pistol which combines a low bore axis, striker fire and weight is the Wildebeest pistol.

== See also ==
- Boresight (firearm)
