= Meriden Firearms Co. =

Meriden Firearms Co
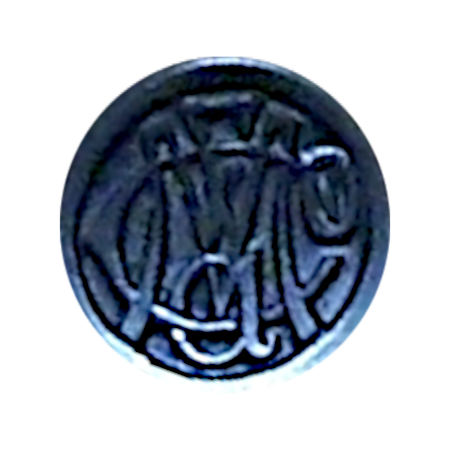
- Company type: Private
- Industry: Firearms
- Founded: 1905
- Defunct: 1918
- Fate: Dissolved
- Headquarters: Meriden, Connecticut, United States
- Area served: Predominately the United States
- Key people: Albert James Aubrey, Fred Biffar, William H. Gough
- Products: Shotguns, revolvers, rifles
- Parent: Sears, Roebuck & Company

The Meriden Firearms Company of Meriden, Connecticut, USA manufactured small arms from 1905 to 1918. Meriden manufactured 20 varieties of hammer and hammerless revolvers with an output of 100 handguns a day in 1906. In addition to revolvers the company manufactured shotguns and rifles.

The Meriden Firearms Company was formed when Sears, Roebuck & Co. purchased the Andrew Fyrberg & Sons firearms manufacturing plant and moved the plant and machinery to Meriden, Connecticut, in 1905 in the Malleable Iron Company's plant. The company sold their firearms through the Sears catalog as well as via other retailers (using different trade names). Meriden introduced the Model 15 slide-action .22 rifle based on Savage patents in the fall of 1912. The main plant of the company was sold to New England Westinghouse in 1916 (which soon resold it to Colt), and in 1918 due to the end of WWI Sears closed the Meriden Firearms Company.

== Revolvers ==
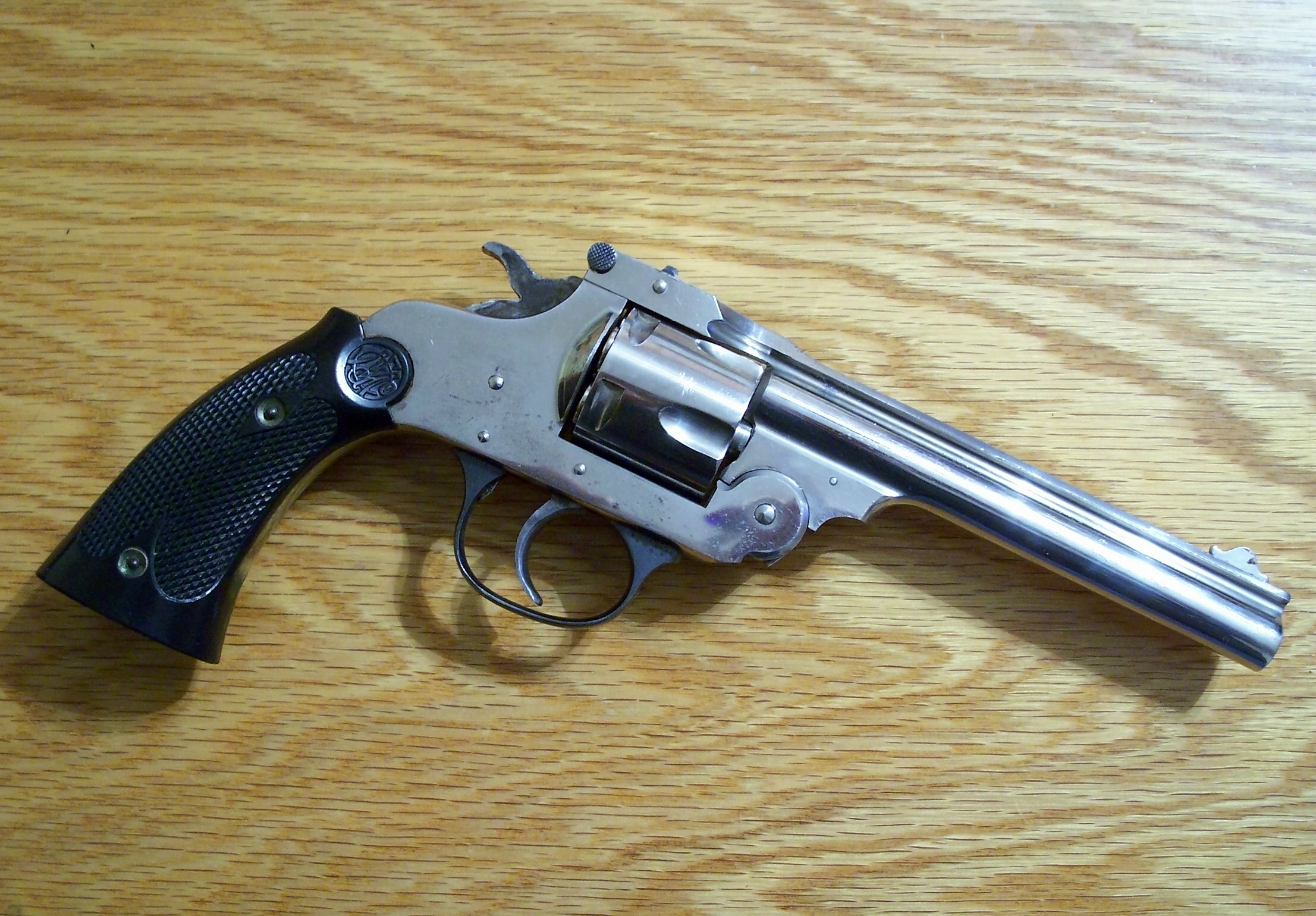
Meriden .38 pocket pistol

Meriden manufactured double-action top-break revolvers in various barrel lengths and finishes. Calibers were either .32 S&W or .38 S&W with either an exposed or enclosed hammer. The barrels were marked "Meriden Firearms Co. Meriden, Conn USA". These guns were referred to as "pocket pistols" and were made between 1905 and 1915. Meriden manufactured twenty varieties of hammer and hammerless revolvers with an output of 100 guns a day in 1906.

== Double & Single barrel shotguns ==
Meriden manufactured 12, 16, and 20 gauge sidelock double-barrel shotguns fitted with steel, laminated, twist, and Damascus barrels. Some of these guns were engraved by artisans who formerly worked for Parker (also located in Meriden). The shotguns were well made and available in a variety of grades. All had automatic safeties and cocking indicators. Barrels could be had in twist, damascus of several grades, armory steel or Krupp steel. Hammerless or hammer shotguns with varying amounts of engraving were available.

== AJ Aubrey ==
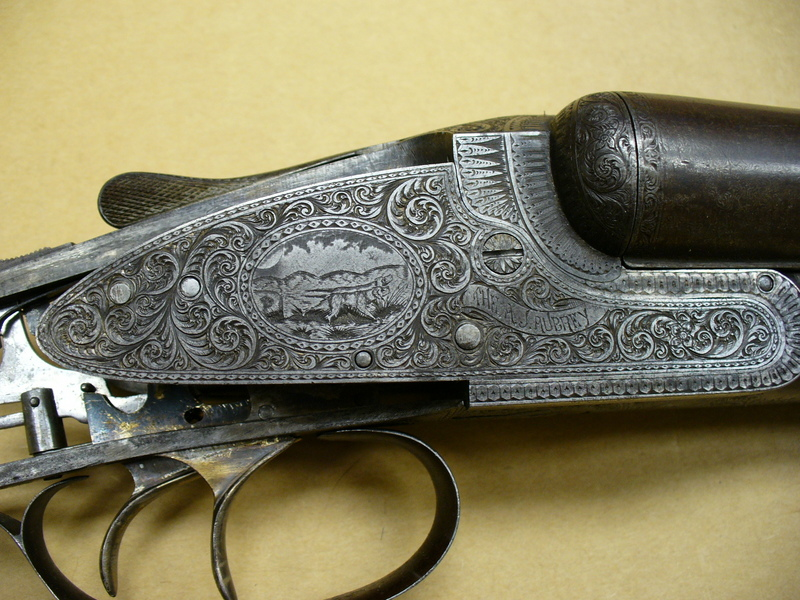
Aubrey Shotgun_number 1000 owned by Daryl Hallquist

In 1906 Albert James Aubrey, former plant superintendent for Wilkes-Barre Gun Co. and the designer of Aubrey shotguns, became the vice president of Meriden Firearms for Sears. Two years later he became president of the division, a position he held until 1916. During his time at Sears, Aubrey filed for and received 8 patents related to firearms.

AJ Aubrey Patents
Description	City Filed from	Patent Number	Date Issued
Improved Safety for breakdown guns	Hopkinton, MA	859477	July 9, 1907
Sight For Firearms	Meriden, CT	839535	December 25, 1906
Sight For Firearms	Meriden, CT	835091	November 6, 1906
Automatic Shell-Ejector for Firearms	Meriden, CT	887569	May 12, 1908
Fore-Stock Fastener for Firearms	Meriden, CT	887568	May 12, 1908
Gun-Lock	Meriden, CT	902639	November 3, 1908
Safety Hammer	Meriden, CT	911362	February 2, 1909
Rifle-Barrel Construction	Meriden, CT	918491	April 20, 1909

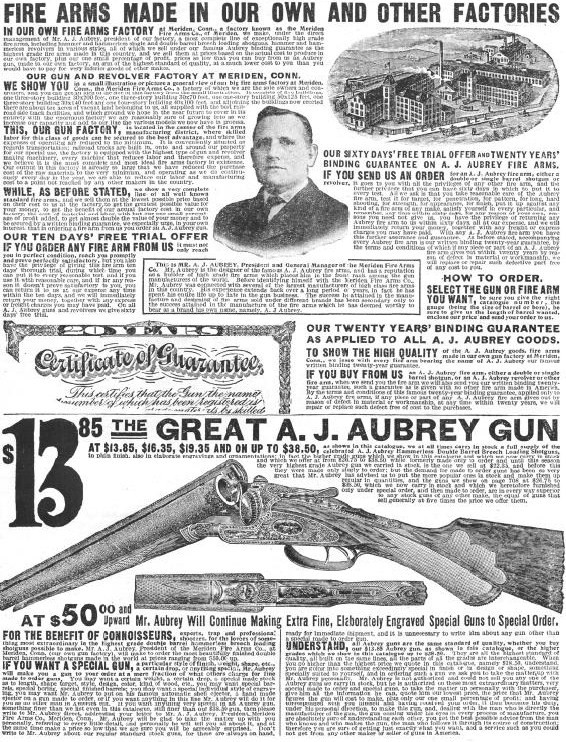
AJ Aubrey catalog page
