= Vz. 52 rifle =

vz. 52 and vz. 52/57
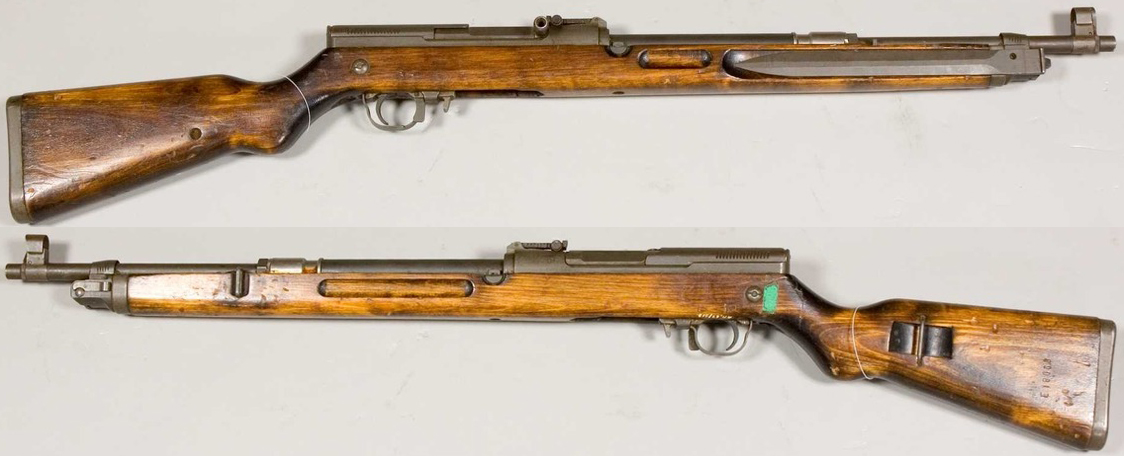
- Vz. 52 from the Swedish Army Museum.
- Type: Semi-automatic rifle
- Place of origin: Czechoslovakia

Service history
- In service: 1952–1959 (Czechoslovakia)
- Used by: See Users
- Wars: 1958 Lebanon Crisis; Vietnam War; Laotian Civil War; Bay of Pigs Invasion; Indonesia–Malaysia confrontation; Rhodesian Bush War; South African Border War; Nigerian Civil War; Yom Kippur War; Lebanese Civil War; Sri Lankan civil war; Invasion of Grenada; Iraq War Kivu conflict Syrian Civil War

Production history
- Designer: Jan and Jaroslav Kratochvíl
- Designed: 1951–1952
- Manufacturer: Považské strojárne, Česká zbrojovka
- Produced: 1952–1959
- No. built: ~ 1 Million
- Variants: vz. 52/57

Specifications
- Mass: 4.14 kg (9.13 lb) (vz. 52); 4.30 kg (9.5 lb) (vz. 52/57)
- Length: 1,005 mm (39.6 in); 1,205 mm (47.4 in) with bayonet deployed
- Barrel length: 520 mm (20.5 in)
- Cartridge: 7.62×45mm (vz. 52); 7.62×39mm (vz. 52/57)
- Action: Gas-operated, tilting breechblock
- Rate of fire: 25 rounds/min (practical)
- Muzzle velocity: 760 m/s (2,493 ft/s) (vz. 52); 735 m/s (2,411.4 ft/s) (vz. 52/57)
- Effective firing range: 650 m (vz. 52); 400 m (vz. 52/57)
- Maximum firing range: 2,000 m (vz. 52/57)
- Feed system: Clip-fed, staggered-column, 10-round detachable box magazine
- Sights: Open iron sights graduated from 100 to 900 m

The vz. 52 rifle is a semi-automatic rifle developed shortly after the Second World War in Czechoslovakia. Its full name is 7,62mm samonabíjecí puška vzor 52. Vz. 52 is an abbreviation for vzor 52, meaning "model 52". It fires the unique 7.62×45mm cartridge. 52 rifles were made by Považské strojárne in Považská Bystrica, but due to production difficulties, its manufacture was taken over by Česká zbrojovka Uherský Brod.

== Design details ==
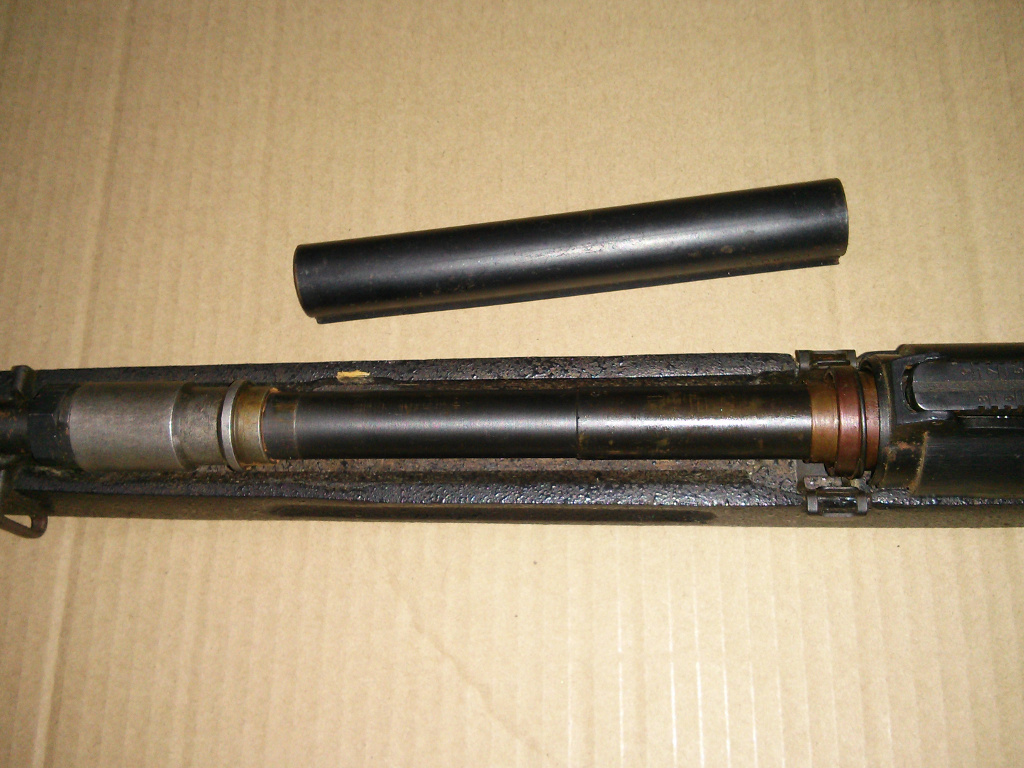
Vz. 52 with handguard removed to show the gas system. The nut closer to sling bracket is the adjusting nut locknut. Between the gas piston (lighter colour) and the locknut is the adjusting nut itself. Operating rod removed and placed on the right side.

The vz. 52 is a shoulder-fired semi-automatic rifle with a tilting-bolt locking mechanism powered by an annular short-stroke gas piston system. The bolt is locked by two lugs that recess into slots machined into the receiver. However, unlike most vertically-locking breech mechanism, the rifle's bolt has the unusual feature of tipping the bolt frontally to lock the mechanism, whereas other tipping bolt designs tip the bolt to the rear. The piston is actuated by residual gases from the bore, vented into a sleeve surrounding the barrel to overcome the inertia of the bolt carrier, bolt and the resistance of the return spring in order to unlock the chamber, eject the empty cartridge casing and then introduce a new round into the chamber upon return to battery.

The barrel is press-fit and pinned into the receiver. The manual safety switch is placed inside of the trigger guard and is manipulated by the shooter's index finger. The trigger mechanism closely resembles that used in the American M1 Garand semi-automatic rifle. The cocking handle is integrated into the bolt carrier and is located on the right side of the rifle.

The rifle is equipped with open-type iron sights with a hooded front post and V-notch rear sight placed on a sliding tangent, adjustable for elevation between 100–950 m. The rifle can also accept day and night-time optics that interface with an optional, receiver-mounted side rail. The one-piece pistol grip stock is carved from either walnut or beech and stained a yellowish-brown color; the stock has a hollowed butt which is used as a storage compartment for a cleaning rod, oil bottle and accessories. The rifle has an integral blade bayonet which folds into a recess carved into the stock on the right side.

The vz. 52 feeds from a detachable box magazine with a 10-round cartridge capacity but could also be rapidly recharged from stripper clips with the bolt retracted. For this purpose, a stripper clip guide is milled into the front face of the bolt carrier, aligning with the magazine when the bolt is locked in the open position. This is the primary method of reloading the rifle as infantrymen were only issued 2 magazines per rifle. It ejects cartridge cases vigorously forward and to the left.

== Conversion ==
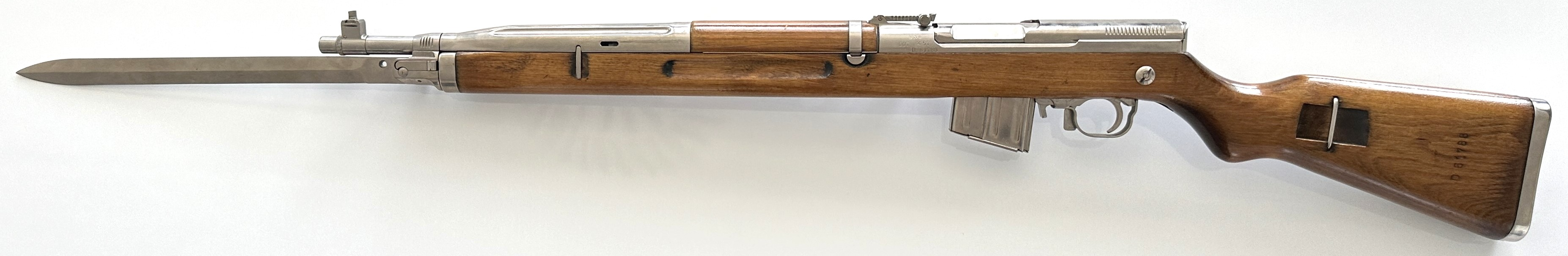
Vz. 57

After pressure from the Soviet Union to adopt its 7.62×39mm cartridge, existing Czech rifles were rechambered to the Soviet caliber, and all further production of the rifle was chambered in this caliber and re-designated the vz. 52/57. The vz. 52/57 is identical to the vz. 52 except for its barrel and its magazines. It is considerably less common and is generally found in better condition due to the vz. 52/57 chromium-plated bore and chamber. The vz. 52 magazines can be used with the vz. 52/57, but they do not feed as reliably.

== Decommissioning ==
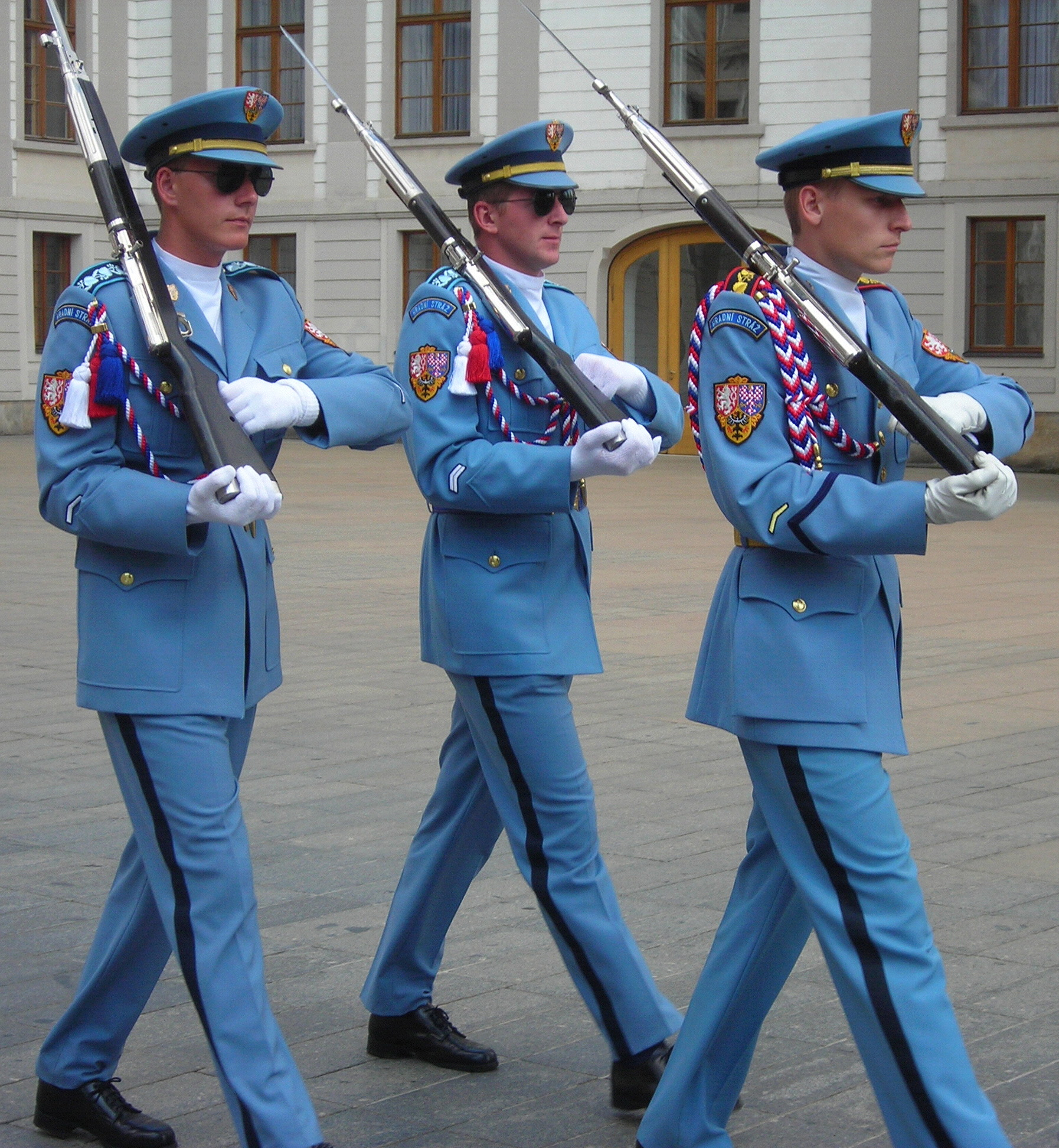
Prague Castle Guard carrying the vz. 52

All of the vz. 52 series were quickly replaced in Czechoslovak service by the vz. 58, but the earlier rifles found their way to Soviet allies during the Cold War, and have seen service in Grenada, Somalia, Cuba and Afghanistan and many of those were passed on to guerrillas. At least 12,000 of Cuba's vz. 52s were emptied from that country's reserve stocks and donated to Angola as military aid during the Cuban intervention in Angola.

The Czech Castle guard uses chrome-finished, deactivated vz. 52 rifles with darkened wood stocks as ceremonial weapons.

== Users ==
- Angola − 12,000 delivered in 1975
- Biafra − 820 delivered in 1967
- Cuba − Used during the Escambray rebellion, Bay of Pigs invasion. Also used by Milicias de Tropas Territoriales. It proved to be unpopular in MTT service due to both the vz. 52 and 52/57 being in MTT use causing confusion with the magazines and ammunition. Some 52/57s were used during the US Invasion of Grenada
- Czechoslovakia
- Egypt
- Ethiopia
- Grenada − During the New Jewel Movement regime
- Guinea-Bissau − vz. 52/57.
- Indonesia − In service with the KorMar, and with the Army as ceremonial weapon.
- Israel
- Jordan
- Kuwait − Delivered in 1965
- Lebanon − At least 2 delivered in 1972
- Nicaragua − Some later given as aid to the Salvadoran FMLN.
- Nigeria
- Qatar − At least 10 delivered in 1968
- Somalia
- Syria
- Tanzania
- Vietnam − very limited use
- Yemen
- Zimbabwe − used by ZIPRA and ZANLA

=== Non-state ===
- Democratic Forces for the Liberation of Rwanda
- Liberation Tigers of Tamil Eelam − Modified to accept Kalashnikov rifle magazines
- People's Liberation Army of Namibia

== See also ==
- AG-42
  - Hakim Rifle
  - Rasheed Carbine
- FN Model 1949
- SKS

== Bibliography ==
- Čermák, Jiří (1999). 40 let konstruktérem zbraní 1946-1986 (Od samopalu ČZ 247 ke zbraňovému kompletu LADA). Brno: Ardent. ISBN 80-238-3397-9.
- Ezell, Edward Clinton (1988). Small arms today: latest reports on the world's weapons and ammunition (2nd ed.). Harrisburg, PA: Stackpole Books. ISBN 978-0-8117-2280-3.
- Popelínský, Lubomír (1999). Československé automatické zbraně a jejich tvůrci. Praha: Naše vojsko. ISBN 80-206-0567-3.
- Šáda, Miroslav (2004). Československé ruční palné zbraně a kulomety. Praha: Naše vojsko. ISBN 80-206-0745-5.
- Smisek, Martin (2021). Czechoslovak arms exports to the Middle East Volume 1, Origins, Israel and Jordan 1948−1989. Warwick, England: Helion & Company. ISBN 978-1-804511-11-4.
- Walter, John (2006). Rifles of the World (3rd ed.). Iola, Wisconsin: Krause Publications. ISBN 978-0-89689-241-5.
