= Semi-automatic firearm =

Type of firearm

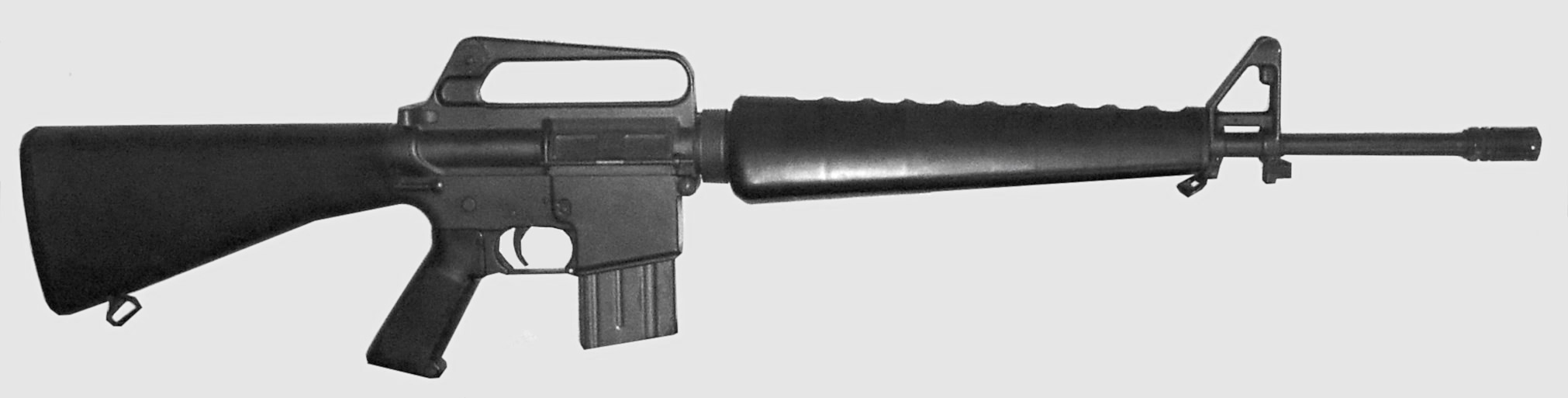
The Colt AR-15, a type of semi-automatic rifle

A schematic of a semi automatic operation in a hammer fired closed-bolt firearm

A schematic of a semi-automatic operation in an open-bolt firearm

A semi-automatic firearm, also called a self-loading or autoloading firearm (fully automatic and selective fire firearms are also variations on self-loading firearms), is a repeating firearm whose action mechanism automatically loads a following round of cartridge into the chamber and prepares it for subsequent firing, but requires the shooter to manually actuate the trigger in order to discharge each shot. Typically, this involves the weapon's action utilizing the excess energy released during the preceding shot (in the form of recoil or high-pressure gas expanding within the bore) to unlock and move the bolt, extracting and ejecting the spent cartridge case from the chamber, re-cocking the firing mechanism, and loading a new cartridge into the firing chamber, all without input from the user. To fire again, however, the user must actively release the trigger, and allow it to "reset", before pulling the trigger again to fire off the next round. As a result, each trigger pull only discharges a single round from a semi-automatic weapon, as opposed to a fully automatic weapon, which will shoot continuously as long as the ammunition is replete and the trigger is kept depressed.

Ferdinand Ritter von Mannlicher produced the first successful design for a semi-automatic rifle in 1885, and by the early 20th century, many manufacturers had introduced semi-automatic shotguns, rifles and pistols.

In military use, the semi-automatic M1911 handgun was adopted by the United States Army in 1911, and subsequently by many other nations. Semi-automatic rifles did not see widespread military adoption until just prior to World War II, the M1 Garand being a notable example. Modern service rifles such as the M4 carbine are often selective-fire, capable of semi-automatic and automatic or burst-fire operation. Civilian variants such as the AR-15 are generally semi-automatic only.

== Early history (1885–1945) ==
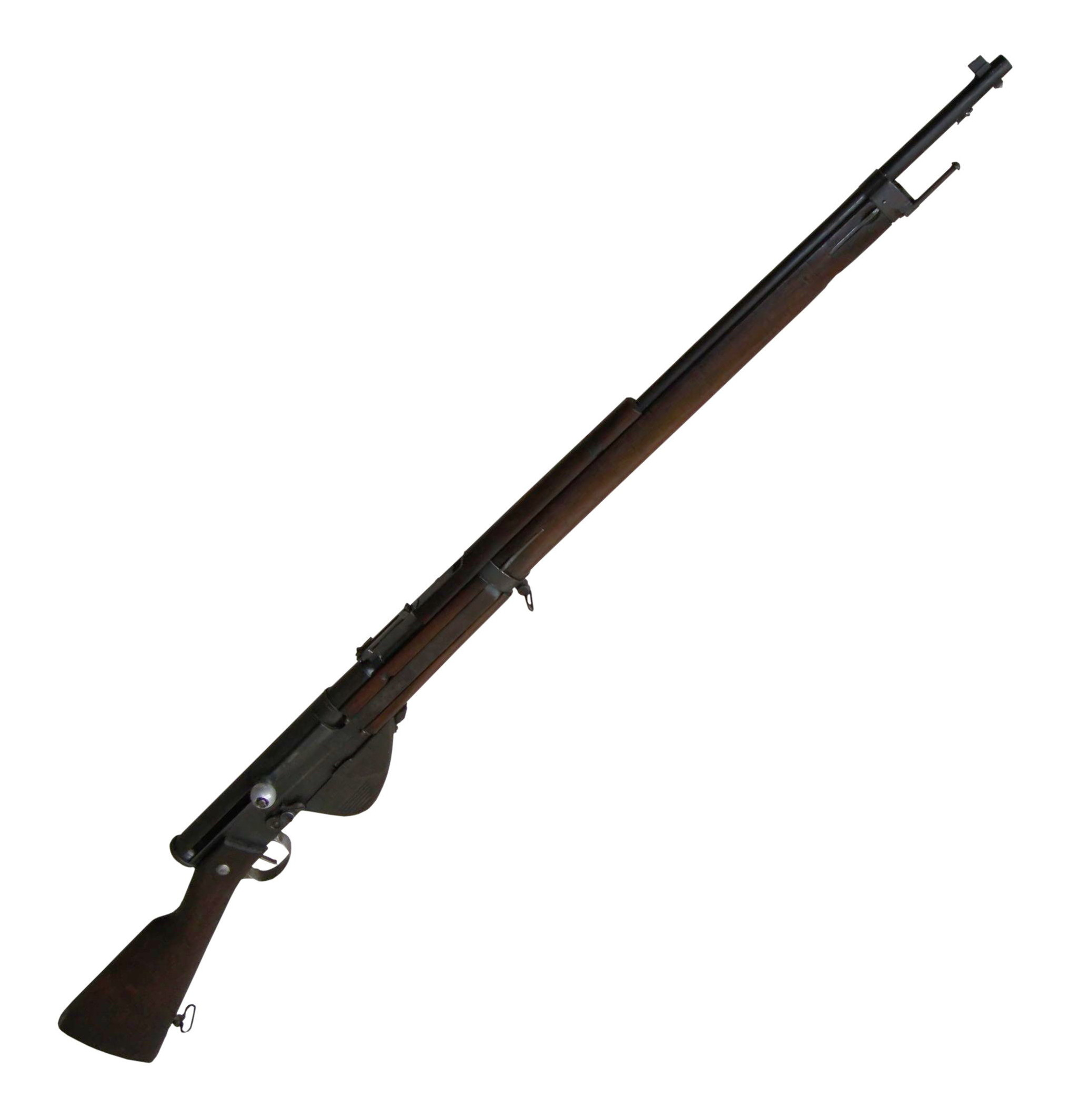
The Fusil Automatique Modèle 1917 was the first semi-automatic gun that fires cartridges to be widely issued to the infantry of any nation's army.

The first successful design for a semi-automatic rifle is attributed to Austria-born gunsmith Ferdinand Ritter von Mannlicher, who unveiled the design in 1885. The Model 85 was followed by the equally innovative Mannlicher Models 91, 93 and 95 semi-automatic rifles. Although Mannlicher earned his reputation with his bolt-action rifle designs, he also produced a few semi-automatic pistols, including the Steyr Mannlicher M1894, which employed an unusual blow-forward action and held five rounds of 6.5mm ammunition that were fed into the M1894 by a stripper clip.

=== Semi-automatic shotgun ===
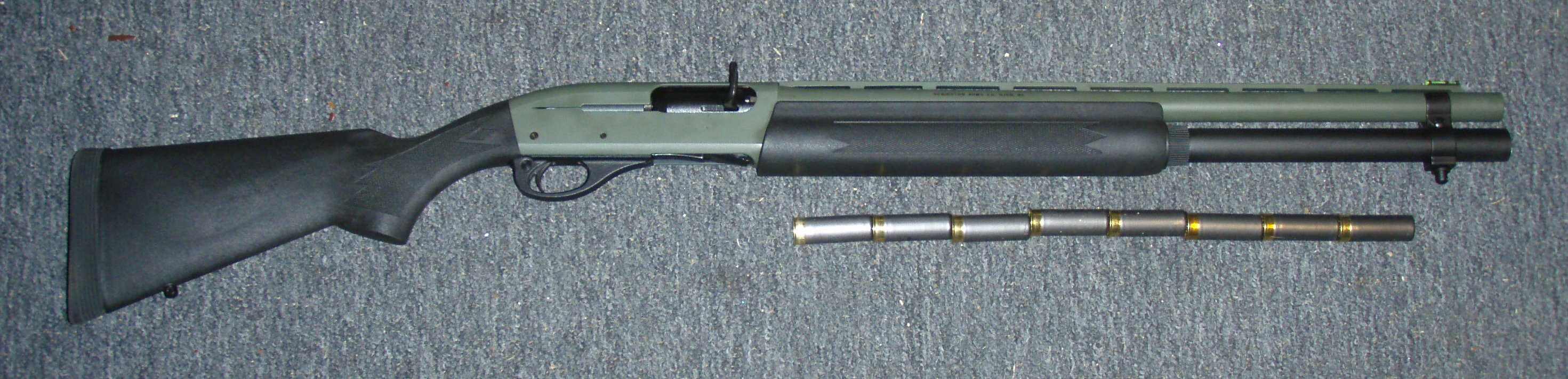
Remington 1100 Tactical Shotgun in 12 gauge – an example of a semi-automatic shotgun

In 1902, American gunsmith John Moses Browning developed the first successful semi-automatic shotgun, the Browning Auto-5, which was first manufactured by Fabrique Nationale de Herstal and sold in America under the Browning name. The Auto-5 relied on long recoil operation; this design remained the dominant form in semi-automatic shotguns for approximately 50 years. Production of the Auto-5 ended in 1998.

=== Blowback semi-automatic ===
In 1903 and 1905, the Winchester Repeating Arms Company introduced the first semi-automatic rimfire and centerfire rifles designed especially for the civilian market. The Winchester Model 1903 and Winchester Model 1905 operated on the principle of blowback in order to function semi-automatically. Designed entirely by T. C. Johnson, the Model 1903 achieved commercial success and continued to be manufactured until 1932 when the Winchester Model 63 replaced it.

By the early 20th century, several manufacturers had introduced semi-automatic .22 sporting rifles, including Winchester, Remington, Fabrique Nationale and Savage Arms, all using the direct blow-back system of operation. Winchester introduced a medium caliber semi-automatic sporting rifle, the Model 1907 as an upgrade to the Model 1905, utilizing a blowback system of operation, in calibers such as .351 Winchester. Both the Models of 1905 and 1907 saw limited military and police use.

=== Notable early semi-automatic rifles ===
In 1906, Remington Arms introduced the Remington Auto-loading Repeating Rifle. Remington advertised this rifle, renamed the "Model 8" in 1911, as a sporting rifle. This is a locked-breech, long recoil action designed by John Browning. The rifle was offered in .25, .30, .32, and .35 caliber models, and gained popularity among civilians as well as some law enforcement officials who appreciated the combination of a semi-automatic action and relatively powerful rifle cartridges. The Model 81 superseded the Model 8 in 1936 and was offered in .300 Savage as well as the original Remington calibers.

The first semi-automatic rifle adopted and widely issued by a major military power (France) was the Fusil Automatique Modele 1917. This is a locked-breech, gas-operated action that is very similar in its mechanical principles to the future M1 Garand in the United States. The M1917 was fielded during the latter stages of World War I but it did not receive a favorable reception. However, its shortened and improved version, the Model 1918, was much more favourably received during the Moroccan Rif War from 1920 to 1926. The Lebel bolt-action rifle remained the standard French infantry rifle until replaced in 1936 by the MAS-36 despite the various semi-automatic rifles designed between 1918 and 1935.

Other nations experimented with self-loading rifles between the two World Wars, including the United Kingdom, which had intended to replace the bolt-action Lee–Enfield with a self-loader, possibly chambered for sub-caliber ammunition, but discarded that plan as the imminence of the Second World War and the emphasis shifted from replacing every rifle with a new design to speeding-up re-armament with existing weapons. The Soviet Union and Nazi Germany would both issue successful self-loading and selective-fire rifles on a large scale during the course of the war, but not in sufficient numbers to replace their standard bolt-action rifles.

=== Notable gas-operated rifles ===
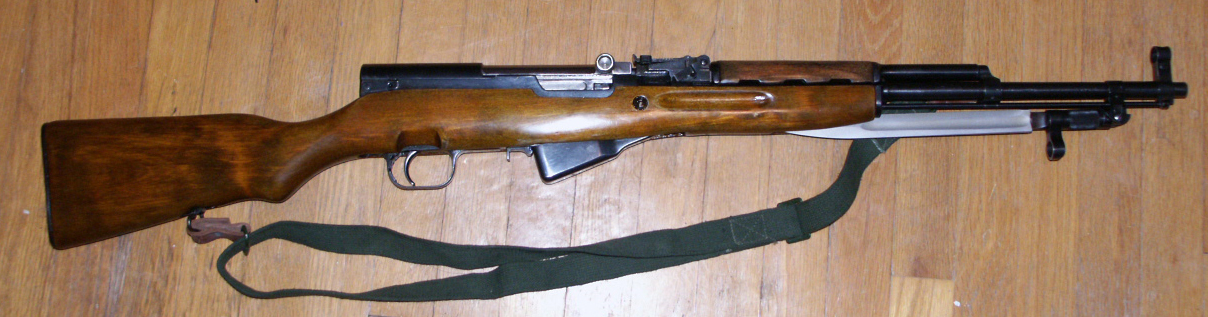
The SKS is a semi-automatic Russian rifle

In 1937, the American M1 Garand was the first semi-automatic rifle to replace its nation's bolt-action rifle as the standard-issue infantry weapon. The gas-operated M1 Garand was developed by Canadian-born John Garand for the U.S. government at the Springfield Armory in Springfield, Massachusetts. After years of research and testing, the first production model of the M1 Garand was unveiled in 1937. During World War II, the M1 Garand gave American infantrymen an advantage over their opponents, most of whom were issued slower firing bolt-action rifles.

The Soviet AVS-36, SVT-38 and SVT-40 (originally intended to replace the Mosin-Nagant as their standard service rifle), as well as the German Gewehr 43, were semi-automatic gas-operated rifles issued during World War II. In practice, they did not replace the bolt-action rifle as a standard infantry weapon.

Another gas-operated semi-automatic rifle developed toward the end of World War II was the SKS. Designed by Sergei Gavrilovich Simonov in 1945, it came equipped with a bayonet and could be loaded with ten rounds, using a stripper clip. However, the SKS was quickly replaced by the AK-47, produced at around the same time, but with a 30-round magazine, and select fire capability. The SKS was the first widely issued weapon to use the 7.62×39mm cartridge.

== Types ==
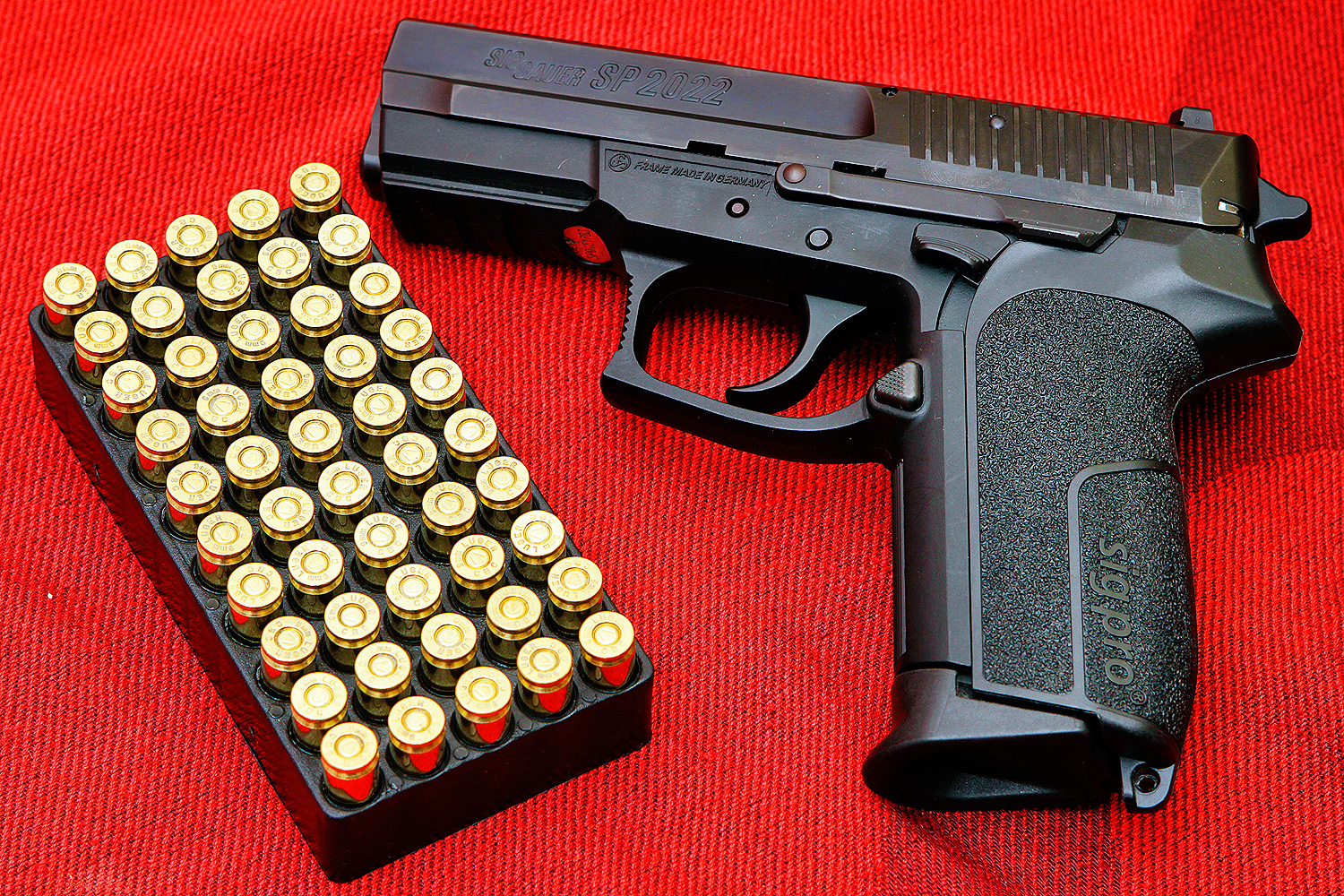
SIG Pro semi-automatic pistol

There are semi-automatic pistols, rifles, and shotguns designed and made as semi-automatic only. Selective-fire firearms are capable of both full automatic and semi-automatic modes.

Semi-automatic refers to a firearm that uses the force of recoil or gas to eject the empty case and load a fresh cartridge into the firing chamber for the next shot and which allows repeat shots solely through the action of pulling the trigger. A double-action revolver also requires only a trigger pull for each round that is fired but is not considered semi-automatic since the manual action of pulling the trigger is what advances the cylinder, not the energy of the preceding shot.

== Fully automatic compared to semi-automatic ==
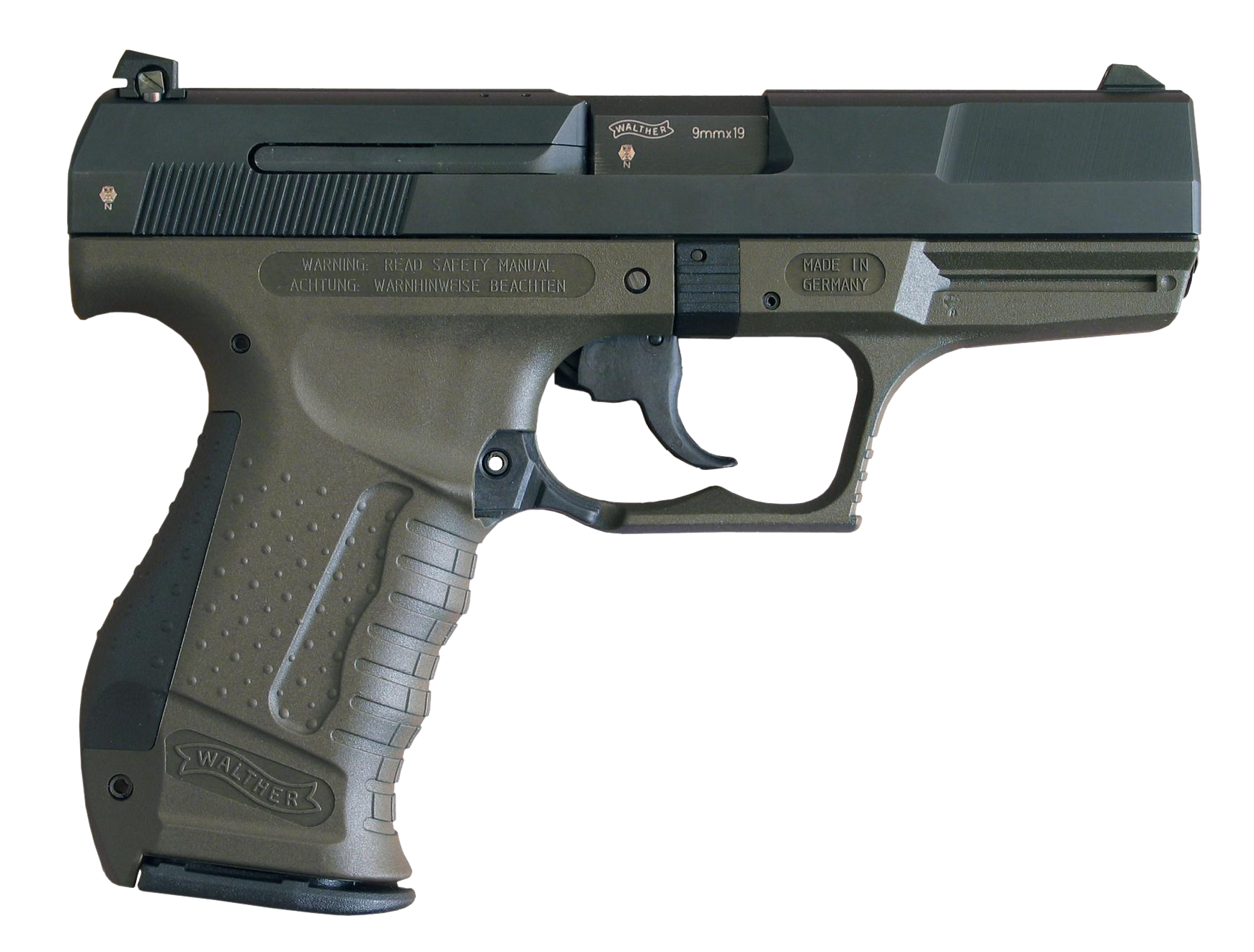
Walther P99, a semi-automatic pistol from the late 1990s

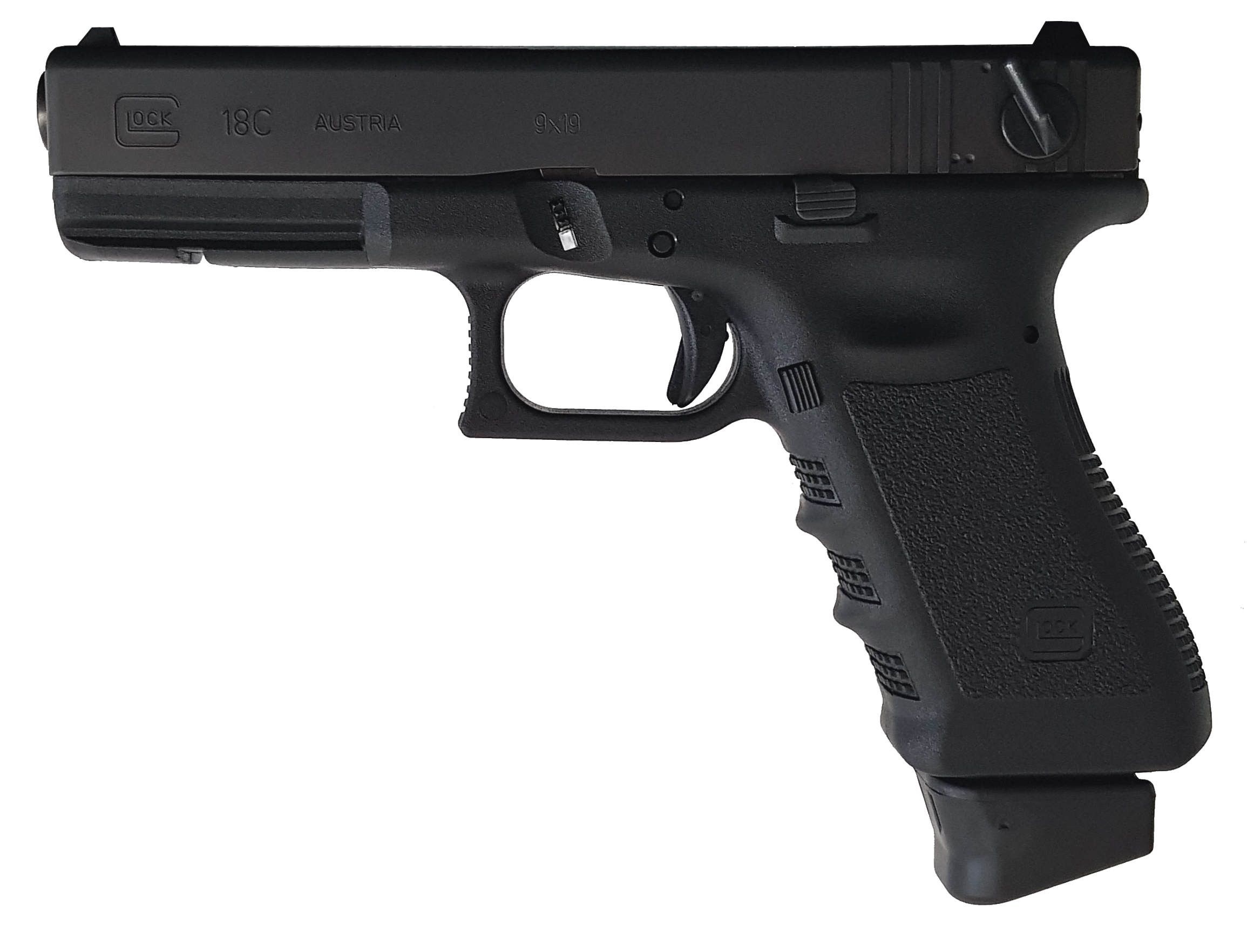
Glock 18, a fully-automatic machine pistol from the mid-1980s (The picture shown is the Glock 18C)

The usage of the term automatic may vary according to context. Gun specialists point out that the word automatic is sometimes misunderstood to mean fully automatic fire when used to refer to a self-loading, semi-automatic firearm not capable of fully automatic fire. In this case, automatic refers to the loading mechanism, not the firing capability. To avoid confusion, it is common to refer to such firearms as an "autoloader" in reference to their loading mechanism.

The term "automatic pistol" almost exclusively refers to a semi-automatic (i.e. not fully automatic) pistol (fully automatic pistols are usually referred to as machine pistols). With handguns, the term "automatic" is commonly used to distinguish semi-automatic pistols from revolvers. The term "auto-loader" may also be used to describe a semi-automatic handgun. However, to avoid confusion, the term "automatic rifle" is generally, conventionally, and best restricted to a rifle capable of fully automatic fire. Both uses of the term "automatic" can be found; the exact meaning must be determined from context.

== Auto-loading ==
The mechanism of semi-automatic (or autoloading) firearms is usually what is known as a closed-bolt firing system. In a closed-bolt system, a round must first be chambered manually before the weapon can fire. When the trigger is pulled, only the hammer and firing pin move, striking and firing the cartridge. The bolt then recoils far enough rearward to extract and load a new cartridge from the magazine into the firearm's chamber, ready to fire again once the trigger is pulled.

An open-bolt mechanism is a common characteristic of fully automatic firearms. With this system, pulling the trigger releases the bolt from a cocked, rearward position, pushing a cartridge from the magazine into the chamber, firing the gun. The bolt retracts to the rearward position, ready to strip the next cartridge from the magazine. The open-bolt system is often used in submachine guns and other weapons with a high rate of fire. It is rarely used in semi-automatic-only firearms, which can fire only one shot with each pull of the trigger. The closed-bolt system is generally more accurate, as the centre of gravity changes relatively little at the moment the trigger is pulled.

With fully automatic weapons, the open-bolt operation allows air to circulate, cooling the barrel. With semi-automatic firearms, the closed-bolt operation is preferred, as overheating is not as critical, and accuracy is preferred. Some select-fire military weapons use an open bolt in fully automatic mode and a closed bolt when semi-automatic is selected.

== Legal status ==
Many jurisdictions regulate some or all semi-automatic firearms differently than other types.

Various types of semi-automatic weapons were restricted for civilian use in New Zealand after the 2019 Christchurch mosque shootings, in Australia after the 1996 Port Arthur massacre, in Norway after the 2011 Utøya shooting. In the United States, the 1994–2004 Federal Assault Weapons Ban prohibited semi-automatic weapons with certain additional characteristics. As of 2023, several U.S. states still restrict similar types of semi-automatic weapons.

== Examples ==
- Borchardt C-93
- Dragunov (SVD-63) sniper rifle
- Fusil Automatique Modele 1917
- Gewehr 43
- CZ-75
- Glock 17
- L1A1 SLR
- Luger pistol
- M1 Carbine
- M1 Garand
- M1911 pistol
- MAS-49 rifle
- Meunier rifle
- Mondragón rifle
- Remington Model 1100
- SKS
- Smith & Wesson M&P15-22
- SVT-40
- TEC-9
- Type 4 rifle

== See also ==
- Main articles
  - Semi-automatic pistol
  - Semi-automatic rifle
  - Semi-automatic shotgun
- Related subjects
  - AR-15 style rifle
  - Assault rifle
  - Assault weapon – certain semi-automatic firearms are classified as assault weapons in some jurisdictions
  - Designated marksman rifle
  - Personal defense weapon
  - Repeating rifle
  - Single-shot
  - Forced reset trigger
