= Hakim rifle =

Semi-automatic rifle

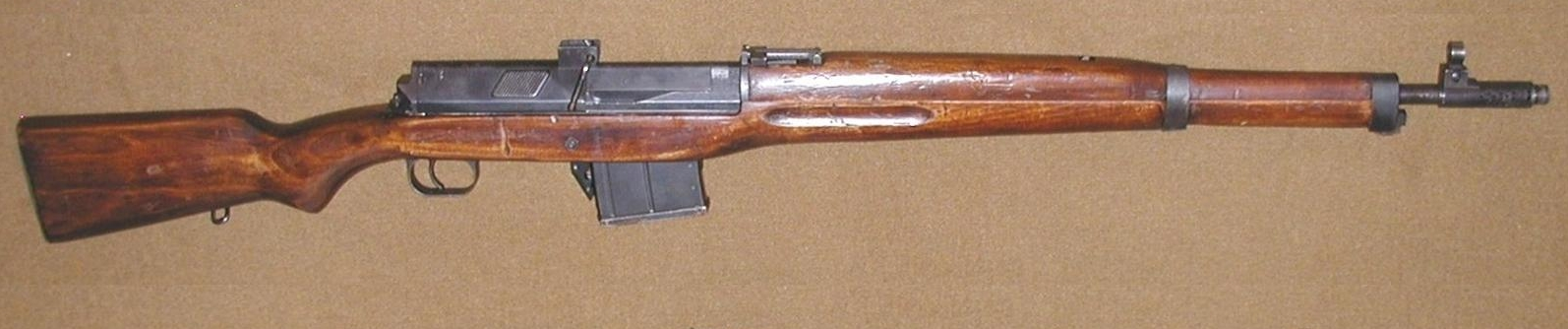
- Egyptian Hakim rifle
- Type: Semi-automatic rifle
- Place of origin: Egypt; Sweden (design)

Service history
- Used by: Egypt; South Yemen; Tunisia; Somalia; Irish National Liberation Army
- Wars: 1964 Ethiopian–Somali War; The Troubles

Production history
- Designer: Erik Eklund
- Manufacturer: Ministry of Military Production, Factory 54 (Maadi)
- Produced: 1950s–1960s
- No. built: c. 70,000
- Variants: Rasheed Carbine

Specifications
- Mass: 4.75 kg (10.5 lb) (unloaded)
- Length: 1,216 mm (47.9 in)
- Barrel length: 638 mm (25.1 in)
- Cartridge: 7.92×57mm Mauser
- Action: Direct impingement, gas-operated
- Feed system: 10-round detachable box magazine, loaded from the top breech via stripper clips

The Hakim rifle is a gas-operated semi-automatic rifle. It was originally designed in Sweden by Erik Eklund and produced as the Ag m/42 for the Swedish Army. The tooling and design were later sold to Egypt, and the Hakim was produced there during the 1950s and early 1960s. It was replaced in the mid-1960s by the Maadi AK-47 (a licensed copy of the Soviet rifle) but was stored in military reserve arsenals. In more recent years, it has been observed in use by some Egyptian police units. Around 70,000 were made.

A shortened carbine version of this rifle called the Rasheed was manufactured in limited numbers in Egypt, using the smaller 7.62x39mm cartridge.

Due to its age, the Hakim is designated as a curio and relic firearm by the United States Bureau of Alcohol, Tobacco, Firearms and Explosives.

== History ==
"The Hakim," an Arabic term meaning the "wise man", refers to an enhanced Egyptian iteration of the Swedish Automatgevär m/42. After the 1952 Egyptian revolution, General Gamal Abdul Nasser initiated a campaign to modernize the Egyptian military. This involved procuring manufacturing equipment and initial technical support from Sweden to construct an Egyptian variant of the Ag m/42. This marked the inception of Egypt's domestic small-arms industry.

A total of around 70,000 rifles would be produced.

== Design ==
Egypt introduced an adjustable gas operated system, whereas the Ag m/42 had been non-adjustable. The Hakim system is adjustable by use of a special tool and is a simple, direct impingement type whereby the flow of gas impacts directly on the front face of the bolt carrier, propelling it to the rear, which unlocks and moves the bolt as it does so. The Hakim features a Tokarev-pattern tipping bolt system as used in the FN-49, SKS and MAS-49 rifles.

While the Ag m/42 fired the 6.5×55mm cartridge, Egypt owned large stockpiles of 8×57mm Mauser ammunition, much of it left behind from World War II. To take advantage of the large stockpile, the Hakim was further re-engineered to accept the larger cartridge, which also necessitated the addition of a permanent, non removable muzzle brake to help reduce the concurrent greater recoil. Some internet sites have incorrectly referred to this as a flash suppressor; the two are distinctly different features that serve entirely different functions: a muzzle brake is designed to reduce recoil (thereby reducing stress on the operator, as well as wear on the rifle itself), whereas a flash suppressor is designed to reduce the bright muzzle flash so that it does not blind the operator when firing in dark conditions.

The Hakim features a 10-round detachable magazine intended to be loaded from the top breech with 5-round stripper clips. Though it is possible to modify magazines designed for the MG13 to fit and be used in the Hakim, bringing its capacity to 25.

== Users ==
- Egypt
- Somalia
- Togo: Hakim rifles were officially adopted by Togolese Armed Forces and were used at least until 1990.
- Tunisia
