= Pansarvärnspjäs 1110 =

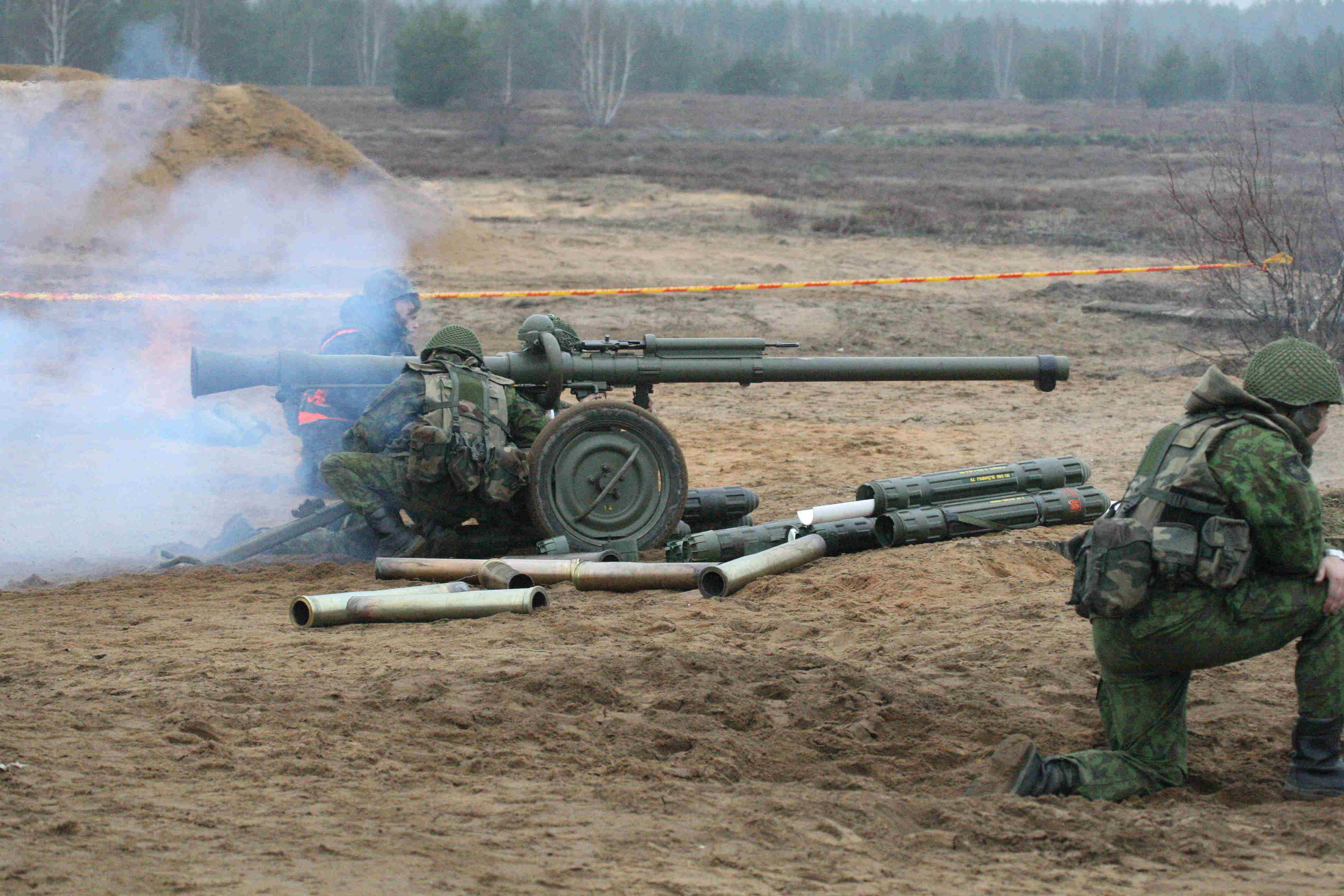
- PV-1110 in Lithuanian National Defence Volunteer Forces service
- Type: Recoilless gun
- Place of origin: Sweden

Service history
- Used by: See Users

Production history
- Designed: 1953
- Manufacturer: Bofors
- Produced: 1959

Specifications
- Mass: Barrel: 120 kg (264 lb); With carriage: 260 kg (573 lb)
- Length: 4.1 m (13 ft 5 in)
- Barrel length: 3.69 m (12 ft 1 in)
- Height: 0.47 m (1 ft 7 in) to 0.87 m (2 ft 10 in) depending on firing position
- Crew: 3
- Shell: 90x760mm HEAT
- Caliber: 90 mm
- Elevation: -10 to +15°
- Traverse: 75 to 115°
- Rate of fire: 6 to 8 rpm
- Muzzle velocity: 650–700 m/s (2,132-2,296 ft/s) depending on ammunition used
- Effective firing range: 900 m (980 yd)
- Sights: Optical with coaxial 7.62 mm Ag m/42-based spotting rifle

The Pansarvärnspjäs 1110 (Pvpj 1110), is a Swedish 90 mm recoilless gun also widely known as Pv-1110 or the "Stovepipe" (Kaminrör). It entered service in the early 1960s and was phased out of service in the Swedish Army in the late 1990s after 1,600 had been produced. Some 300 weapons were transferred to Estonia, Latvia and Lithuania.

The Pvpj 1100 was typically towed by, or mounted on a Pansarvärnspjästerrängbil 9031 Volvo truck. From the late 1970s it has also been mounted on the Terrängbil 11 and the Bandvagn 2062 tracked carrier.

For Arctic warfare it could also be fitted to a pulka and pulled by two skiers.

The Pvpj 1110 is fitted with an optical sight and has an iron sight as backup. A modified Ag m/42 rifle with matching trajectory is used as ranging gun under the designation Inskjutningsgevär 5110.

The type was used by the Irish Army in towed form, and was experimentally fitted to the chassis of an A34 Comet Tank in place of the turret after the tank had been damaged by a fire in 1962 which destroyed the turret. The Comet tank with the Pvpj 1110 became known as “The Headless Coachman”.

The Pvpj 1110 have been seen in use by the Ukrainian army during the Russo-Ukrainian War.

== Ammunition ==
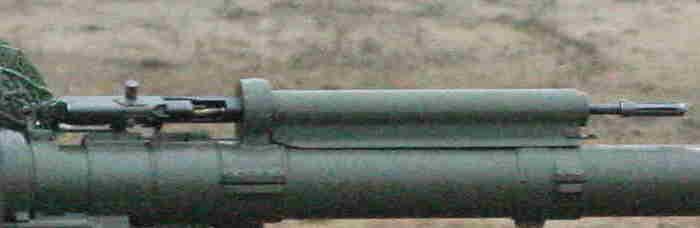
Inskjutningsgevär 5110 7.62x51mm NATO caliber spotting rifle

The Pvpj 1110 is designed to fire fixed-fin stabilised HEAT rounds with tracers. The Swedish designation for these rounds are spårljuspansarspränggranat (slpsgr), literally translated into traced armor-blowing shell, or armor-defeating explosive shell with tracer. The ammunition consists of a projectile inserted into a patronhylsa m/59 brass casing to form a complete cartridge with its own projectile-specific designation.

- Spårljuspansarspränggranat m/62, a 10.7 kg HEAT round that penetrates 380 mm of rolled homogeneous armour (RHA).
- Spårljusövningsgranat m/62, 10.7 kg practice round (no explosive filling) with tracer.
- Laddblindpatron m/1959, an inert round for handling and loading training purposes.
- Spårljuspansarspränggranat m/77, an 11.2 kg HEAT round that penetrates 500 mm of RHA.
- Spårljuspansarspränggranat m/84, a 10 kg HEAT round that penetrates 800 mm of RHA.

During the development of the Infanterikanonvagn 91, the same projectiles would be used, although with different cases, to form the ammunition for the low-pressure main gun. This newly designed gun was not recoilless, and as such necessitated cases with a regular case bottom as opposed to the blow-out recoilless design of the patronhylsa m/59 case.

== Users ==
- Dominican Republic
- Estonia: Estonian Defence League
- Ireland (withdrawn)
- Iraq
- Latvia: Latvian National Guard
- Lithuania: Lithuanian Armed Forces.
- Ukraine: Ukrainian Armed Forces - donated from undisclosed Baltic nation(s), possibly Estonia.
- Sweden (withdrawn from service but kept in storage)

== See also ==
- 120 mm BAT recoilless rifle - similar towed or vehicle mounted British weapon with a 120 mm caliber
- 95 S 58-61 "Musti" - similar towed Finnish weapon with a 95 mm caliber
- Carl Gustaf 8.4cm recoilless rifle - Swedish shoulder-fired recoilless rifle with a 84 mm caliber
