= M58 =

M58 or M-58 may refer to:

- Messier 58, a spiral galaxy in the constellation Virgo
- M58 Wolf, an armored vehicle designed to produce a smoke screen
- M58 MICLIC, a mine-clearing charge
- M58 motorway, a motorway in England
- M58 highway, a federal highway in eastern Siberia, Russian Federation
- M58 (Cape Town), a Metropolitan Route in Cape Town, South Africa
- M-58 (Michigan highway), a state highway in Michigan
- 95 S 58-61, a Finnish towed anti-tank weapon
- M-58 (rocket launcher), a Swiss shoulder-fired man-portable anti-tank rocket launcher
- M58 Helmet, an Austrian or Norwegian copy of the M1 helmet
