= Rasheed carbine =

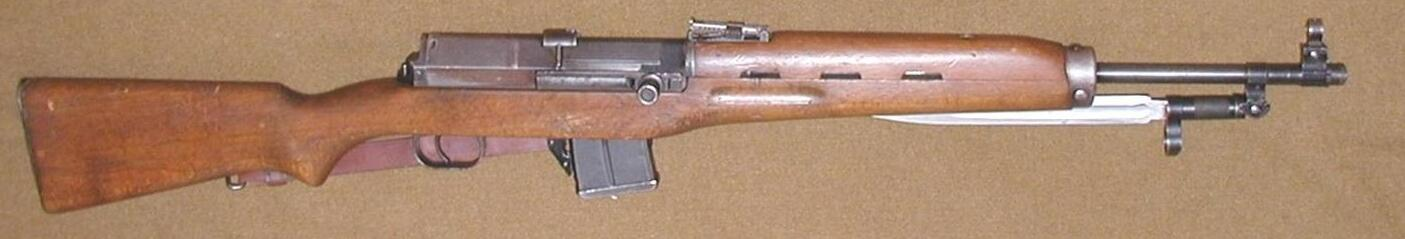
- Side view of the Rasheed carbine
- Type: Semi-automatic carbine
- Place of origin: Egypt

Service history
- Used by: See Users

Production history
- Designer: Erik Eklund
- Manufacturer: Ministry of Military Production, Factory 54
- No. built: c. 8000
- Variants: See Variants

Specifications
- Mass: 4.19 kg (9.2 lb) (unloaded)
- Length: 1,035 mm (40.7 in)
- Barrel length: 520 mm (20 in)
- Cartridge: 7.62×39mm
- Action: direct impingement, gas-operated
- Effective firing range: 300 m (330 yd)
- Feed system: 10-round removable box magazine, with latching magazine release catch

The Rasheed (or sometimes known as the Rashid) is a semi-automatic carbine, derived from the Hakim rifle and used by the Egyptian military. Only around 8,000 were made.

The Rasheed was designed by the Swedish engineer Erik Eklund, who based it on his previous Hakim rifle, which was itself a slightly modified version of the Swedish Ag m/42 rifle. The Rasheed was scaled down to accept much less powerful 7,62×39 Soviet ammunition.

== Design ==
The carbine resembles the Soviet SKS carbine, particularly in the permanently attached pivoting-blade bayonet, which appears identical to its Russian counterpart. The 12-inch (305 mm) blade bayonet pivots from a mount under the barrel, back into a recessed groove in the forend stock.

The carbine features a rear ladder sight, with a "battle" position for short-range fire as well as increments of 100 to 1000 metres, although the latter distance greatly exceeds the 300-metre effective range of the weapon.

The semi-automatic mechanism is gas-operated through the direct impingement system. The Egyptian training manual had users use stripper clips to reload. However, the hot gas would heat up the receiver and cause burns when fingers would touch the receiver.

The Rasheed has a 10-round magazine capacity.

== Variants ==
=== Baghdad Rifle ===
The Baghdad is a variant of the Rasheed, made from the same machinery from 1969 to 1977.

== Users ==
- Egypt
- Iraq: Used the Baghdad rifle.
