= Fusil Automatique Modèle 1917 =

French semi-automatic rifle

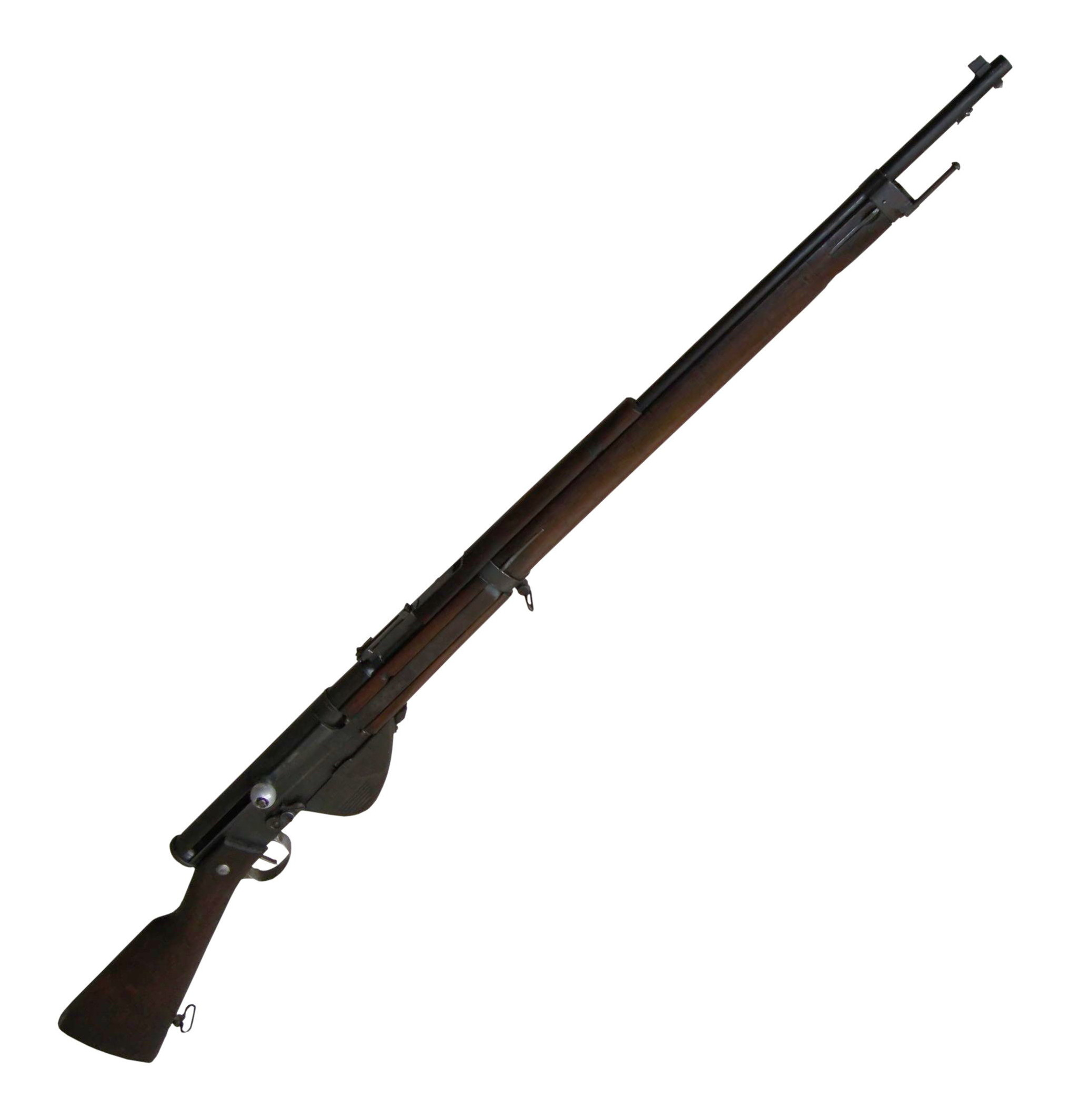
- Mle. 1917 rifle
- Type: Semi-automatic rifle
- Place of origin: France

Service history
- In service: May 1916–1945
- Used by: French Army
- Wars: World War I Rif War; World War II (limited)

Production history
- Designer: Ribeyrolles, Sutter, Chauchat
- Designed: 1913
- Manufacturer: Manufacture Nationale d'Armes de Tulle (MAT) for Mle 1917. Manufacture d'armes de Saint-Étienne (MAS) for Mle 1918.
- Produced: 1916 (Note: Mass production did not begin until April 1917)–November 1918
- No. built: ~85,333 for Mle 1917 and 4,000 for Mle 1918.
- Variants: Model 1917 Carbine; Mle 1918

Specifications
- Mass: 5.25 kg (11.6 lb); 4.8 kg (11 lb) (Mle 1918)
- Length: 133 cm (52.4 in); 110 cm (43.3 in) (Mle 1918)
- Barrel length: 80 cm (31.5 in); 58 cm (22.8 in) (Mle 1918)
- Cartridge: 8×50mmR Lebel
- Action: gas operated, rotating bolt
- Muzzle velocity: 701 m/s (2,300 ft/s)
- Effective firing range: 1,000 metres
- Feed system: 5-round capacity clip-fed internal box magazine
- Sights: Iron Sights

The Fusil Automatique Modèle 1917 ("Model 1917 Automatic Rifle"), also called the RSC M1917, was a gas-operated, semi-automatic rifle placed into service by the French Army during the latter part of World War I in May 1916. It was chambered in 8mm Lebel, the rimmed cartridge used in other French Army infantry weapons of the time. In total, the French national armories, primarily Manufacture d'armes de Saint-Étienne (MAS) and Manufacture Nationale d'Armes de Tulle (MAT), manufactured 86,000 RSC M1917 rifles until production ended in late November 1918. However, very few examples have survived in fully functional, semi-automatic condition and those have become highly sought-after collectibles.

== Development ==
The adoption of the Modèle 1917 can be traced to early attempts by the French Army to replace its Lebel rifles with a more advanced semi-automatic design in the years before the outbreak of the First World War. In 1913, a semi-automatic rifle was selected to be adopted as a replacement for the Lebel and Berthier rifles in the army's inventory. In 1910 the army tentatively adopted the semi-automatic long recoil-operated Meunier rifle as a replacement for the Lebel rifle. Considerable delays were experienced in the final choice for the ammunition, which ended up being a powerful rimless proprietary 7×56.95mm round. Only 1,013 Meunier rifles had been manufactured by 1916 and about 300 were sent for field trials in the trenches. They were well-received, but the requirement for the special ammunition was a major handicap.

The M1917 RSC (Ribeyrolles, Sutter and Chauchat - the weapon's designers) was formally adopted in May 1916. The M1917 was being mass-produced by April 1917, and was less expensive to manufacture than the Meunier rifle since it used standard Lebel rifle components, notably the barrel, stock, handguard, barrel bands and trigger guard. Above all, it was chambered for standard 8mm Lebel ammunition, which was loaded in special five-round en-bloc clips. The Mle 1917 RSC was gas-operated, using a long-stroke piston with a rotating bolt; the gas port was located underneath the barrel near the muzzle as in the later American M1 Garand rifle. The Mle 1917 was widely distributed among French infantrymen during 1918, but the troops did not like it as they found it too heavy, too long and too difficult to maintain in the trenches. The weak point of the rifle was the very small internal diameter of the gas port, which tended to foul with repeated firings, thus leading to weaker and weaker bolt cycling with prolonged use. The gas port required frequent cleaning out (every 100 rounds or so) which could be performed after removing the large brass screw under the front end of the barrel. Furthermore, the special magazine for the Mle 1917 was not particularly strong.

== Variants ==
=== Versions 1, 2, and 3 ===
- Version 1 was the original design and includes a bolt-hold-open which is manually raised to lock the bolt to the rear with a button to release the bolt forward, it did not lock the bolt to the rear when the last round in the magazine was fired.
- Version 2 added an upper handguard, simplified the bolt-hold open/release (still manually operated) minor production upgrades.
- Version 3 of the rifle removed the bolt hold open device and introduced a sliding dust cover as well as additional receiver markings.
- Some versions were equipped with front sights drilled to accept a photoluminescent insert for low light use.

=== Model 1918 RSC ===
Following as a substantial improvement, the Mle 1918 RSC was adopted in 1918 as a rifle planned to replace all other rifles beginning in 1919. Production began in November 1918 just as the war was ending. No Mle 1918 RSC rifles are known to have been used in WWI. The Mle 1918 was significantly shorter and lighter than the Mle 1917 RSC and corrected basically all of the Mle 1917 RSC drawbacks. One of the primary complaints from French soldiers regarding the Mle 1917 RSC was its excessive length at 1330mm (52"). The Mle 1918 RSC was shortened to an overall length of 1100mm (43.3"). The Mle 1918 RSC used modified Mle 1917 RSC receivers; the Mle 1918 RSC marking will have an "8" overstamped on top of the "7" in "Mle 1917." Among the changes were:

- Barrel shortened from 800mm (31.5") to 580mm (22.8") with corresponding changes in the wooden handguards.
- New rear sight assembly which changes the battle sight zero which deleted the all the way forward position. Also has adjustments re-calibrated for shorter sight radius.
- Bolt-hold-open device reintroduced, this time with a last-round-bolt-hold-open feature. This is a spring loaded latch that locks the bolt to the rear once the last (5th) shot has been fired.
- Additional latch on the clip cover for added security in holding the clip cover closed. This latch is visible and actuated on the right side of the receiver.
- Sliding dust cover from the 3rd pattern Mle 1917.
- Simplified butt plate design allowing for faster, cheaper production.
- New, Berthier-style stacking rod intended to alleviate the issue of the old stacking rod catching on vegetation and the like.
- Shortened Bayonet
- Numerous changes to the overall design, with particular emphasis on the gas system, which simplified production, takedown, cleaning, and maintenance of the rifle.
- Receiver modified to accept Mle 1916 Berthier clips. This is perhaps, the most significant change as it allowed for ammo sharing between soldiers carrying the Mle 1918 and the bolt action Berthier rifles. Despite both rifles having been developed at the same time with the backing of the French Army and Government, the design teams do not appear to have made any attempt at commonality of feeding device between the two designs. This meant that, although they shared the same 8mm Lebel cartridge, they had completely different 5 round charger clips which created logistical and tactical difficulties. The French Army had issued out the Mle 1917 across the force, intending to give 16 rifles to each line Infantry Company to be issued to marksmen in those units which were otherwise armed with either Berthiers or older Lebels (in which case replacement by Berthiers was intended). The ammunition for both rifles was issued already loaded onto charger clips which were intended to be disposable. As such, the Army supply system was required to issue 8mm Lebel ammunition in both units of issue, complicating supply. Although an Mle 1917 carrying soldier could save his disposable clips and reload them from downloaded Berthier clips or vice versa, loaded clips could not be shared as needed on the battlefield between soldiers armed with the two different rifles. The modification to the inside of the receiver involved removing material at the back of the clip channel and adding it at the front. It is possible, to file down the back of a Mle 1917 charger channel to accept a Berthier charger clip, but the clip will not be supported at the front leading to movement of the cartridges inside the channel which negatively impacts reliability. The Mle 1918 modification to the Mle 1917 receiver supports Berthier clips both in the front and back, allowing for reliable use, but does not fully support the charger clip as the Mle 1917 does with its original charger.

Firing tests had also shown that the Mle 1918 RSC was more accurate than both the Lebel rifle and the Mle 1917 RSC. The Mle 1918 RSC's production did not begin until November 1918 at MAS (Manufacture d'Armes de Saint-Etienne). Only ~4,000 were made, most of them in 1919, and many were tested in combat during the Rif War of 1921–26 in Morocco, where "they gave complete satisfaction".

=== Model 1917 Carbine ===
An experimental Mle 1917 carbine was tested late in the war but never went into production. An even shorter (17.7 in (450 mm) barrel) "Mle 1917 Mousqueton" model was also tested and similarly not put into production. During the 1920s, an unknown number of Mle 1917 models were converted to carbines by cutting down the barrels, discarding the upper portion of the handguard, and modifying the internal magazine to accept the Berthier clips used by the Mle 1918. These conversions are identifiable as they retain the rifle sights and handguard as well as the Mle 1917 style of butt plate. These conversions were made and used in the Rif War and may have been done as early as late 1918 during the closing months of World War I.

=== Further developments ===
The design of the weapon continued to be updated through the 1920s with production ending in 1921. Notable upgrade kits include:

- 2nd pattern upgraded bolt handle design which was an upgraded replacement part for both the Mle 1917 and Mle 1918 models. This upgrade greatly simplified weapon takedown for cleaning or maintenance. It involved replacement of the bolt handle and replacement or modification to the op rod.
- Last Round Bolt Hold Open (LRBHO) retrofit. This was the LRBHO assembly from the Mle 1918 retrofitted onto Mle 1917's

During the Rif War and the 1920s, many Mle 1917 and 1918 rifles and carbines continued to see use and upgrades and modifications. In 1935, a large number of the weapons had their gas ports blocked off by armorers, rendering the weapon into a straight-pull bolt action. This seems to have been done in conjunction with giving the rifles to French Colonial or reserve troops who were less trusted. It has also been suggested that this was done in the name of preventing ammo waste, a relatively common theme in late 19th and early 20th century military thinking. Remaining semi-automatic examples are reported to have been in use by the Groupes Franc Motorisé de Cavalerie during the Battle of France. During the German occupation, the weapons were type classified as Selbstlade-Gewehr 310(f) and used by Vichy and Volksturm elements.

== Museum displays ==
The Musée de l'Armée, Les Invalides, Paris displays both the Mle 1917 RSC and the Meunier rifle as a part of the permanent World War I (1914–1918) arms, uniforms and equipments exhibits. Within the US, the United States Army Ordnance Museum, the US Military Academy museum at West Point, and the National Firearms Museum all display excellent specimens of the Mle 1917 RSC. The rarer Mle 1918 RSC is currently only displayed at the Musée de l'Armement de la Manufacture Nationale d'Armes de Tulle.

== Users ==
- France
- Nazi Germany: Issued to Volkssturm units. The German designation was Selbstlade-Gewehr 310(f).

== See also ==
- 8×50mmR Lebel - Smokeless rifle cartridge used by the RSC M1917 and it's variants
- Meunier rifle - Pre-World War I French semi-automatic rifle
- Rossignol ENT - Pre-World War I French automatic rifle
- Chauchat-Ribeyrolles 1918 submachine gun
- Berthier Rifle and Carbine - Contemporaneous bolt action development
- MAS-49 - A later French semi-automatic rifle
- FA-MAS Type 62 - A later French battle rifle
