= Meunier rifle =

Meunier rifle A6
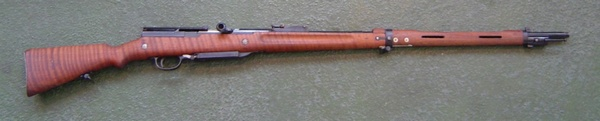
- Type: Semi-automatic rifle
- Place of origin: France

Service history
- In service: 1910–1918
- Used by: France
- Wars: World War I

Production history
- No. built: 1,013 rifles manufactured
- Variants: Meunier A6 Rifle, Carbine.

Specifications
- Mass: 4 kg empty, 4.6 kg with bayonet, 4.1 kg loaded, 4.8 kg loaded with bayonet.
- Length: 1295 mm
- Barrel length: 715 mm
- Cartridge: 7mm Meunier
- Caliber: 7×59mm "7mm Meunier"
- Action: Semi-automatic
- Muzzle velocity: Not fully known due to lack of documentation, some sources say 800 m/s (2700 ft/s), some say more than 914 m/s (3000 ft/s).
- Feed system: 5, 10, 15 round internal magazine, fed with five round stripper clips.
- Sights: Open iron sights

The Meunier rifle, known as the "Meunier A6" or "STA No. 8", evolved as a part of the program initiated in 1890 by the French military to develop a semi-automatic infantry rifle that would eventually replace the Mle 1886–93 Lebel rifle. Four government research establishments (STA, ENT, Puteaux and CTV) proposed over 20 prototypes. About half of them were based on recoil (both short recoil and long recoil) and the others were gas operated. This secret program was placed under the direction of General Naquet-Laroque who headed the Puteaux (APX) government arsenal.

== History ==
Shortly after the adoption of the Lebel 1886 and its revolutionary ammunition, two brothers, Clair, built a semi-automatic shotgun in 1888, an 8 mm semi-auto pistol in 1892, and prototypes of semi-auto rifles were made in 1894. In addition, the adoption in 1888 of the German Kommissions Gewehr with its rimless cartridge had shown the obsolete design of the French 8×50mm rimmed case. Programs were initiated to design a new cartridge and a new rifle.

=== Cartridge development ===
The Section Technique de l'Artillerie (STA) developed various rimless high performance cartridges from 1890 to 1912. Among these cartridges, some were retained:

- 8×58 Meunier 1897
- 6×60 ENT, 1900
- 6.5×60 CAP 1905
- 6.5×61 STA 1910
- 5.5×55.5 Berthier 1910
- 7×59 STA 1912
- 7×57 Meunier 1912

=== Rifle development ===
Between 1894 and 1913, there was a fierce competition to develop a new rifle. They were tested by:

Section Technique de l'Artillerie, Artillery Technical Section aka STA

- Rifle A 1 later redesigned as Rifle A 4
- Rifle A 2 STA 5
- Rifle A 3 STA 6
- Carbine A 4
- Rifle A 5 STA 7
- Rifle A 6 STA 8 (7mm Meunier rifle)

Ecole Normale de Tir, National Shooting School aka ENT

- Rifle B 1, ENT 1901, system Rossignol
- Rifle B 2, System Rossignol
- Rifle B 3, ENT 1902, system Belgrand
- Rifle B 4, system Rossignol
- Rifle B 5, system Rossignol
- Rifle B 6, system Belgrand
- Rifle B 7, system Chezaud
- Rifle B 8, system Vallarnaud

Commission Technique de Versailles, Versailles Technical Commission aka CTV
Etablissement Technique de Puteaux, Puteaux Technical Section aka APX.

- Rifle C 1 CTV 1
- Rifle C 2 CTV 2 system Chauchat
- Rifle C 3 APX 3, system Chauchat & Sutter
- Rifle C 4 APX 4
- Rifle C 5 system Chauchat & Sutter modified Naquet-Laroque aka rifle NL
- Rifle C 6, NL
- Rifle C 7, NL
- Rifle C 8 system Chauchat & Sutter aka Indochinese rifle due to its shorter size, developed to arm indigenous troops in Indochina.

== Test results ==
Out of the various semi-automatic prototypes being tested only three emerged as offering industrial potential:

- The 7mm ENT B5 Rifle by Rossignol which inaugurated direct gas impingement into the bolt.
- The 7mm APX C7 Rifle by Chauchat, Sutter and Naquet-Laroque which was based on the Browning long-recoil system of 1900.
- The 7mm long-recoil operated STA A6 Rifle by Meunier which was also partly derived from the Browning long-recoil system of 1900.

== Adoption of the Meunier rifle ==
The long recoil operated semi-automatic Meunier rifle was adopted in 1910 to replace the Lebel rifle. It gave excellent performance during the final trials: "The 7mm Meunier Rifle fired 9,000 shots without serious incidents".

The A6 Meunier rifle was adopted in 1910, but its final ammunition specifications were not decided upon except for the caliber of 7mm. There were endless debates between the government arsenals at Puteaux and Tulle concerning the length of the case and the bullet's velocity. The final choice for a case length of 56.95 mm (2.242 in) was made in 1912, and the original loading delivered a muzzle velocity of over 1000 meters per second. A lighter load was finally chosen in 1913, allowing the final adoption of the A6 Meunier rifle. The onset of World War I in August 1914 put a halt to a project that would have equipped the French Army with its first semi-automatic infantry rifle.

=== Ammunition ===
The rimless 7×59mm Meunier round was substantially more powerful than 8mm Lebel.

The 7×59mm Meunier had a muzzle velocity of 3,412 ft/s (1,040 m/s). It had a steel core as well as the 7×57mm (7.2×56.95mm) adopted the same year and retained later for the Meunier rifle of 1916 with a velocity reduced to 2,690 ft/s (820 m/s).

Atelier de Construction de Puteaux near Paris manufactured the cartridge; most of the rare samples known are marked APX 1917.

=== Rifle production ===
During spring 1914, MAS tooled up to produce 5000 Meunier rifles each month, but the decision to launch mass production was cancelled due to the risk of introducing a new system at a moment when a conflict with Germany appeared inevitable. Eventually, 1,013 Meunier rifles were manufactured at Tulle arsenal (MAT) by the time World War I broke out; these were tested in the trenches. Only those 1,013 were ever manufactured, and the majority were lost in World War I. Rifles that survived World War I (and the post war years of military refitting) ended up in museums, most were deactivated. Out of these few surviving rifles, almost all were looted and/or lost during the Second World War. For surviving examples as of 2017, see section below.

A carbine version is said to have been manufactured according to Jean Huon, in his book Proud Promise. It states that three were manufactured by cutting down long rifles. One of these carbines exists today in the collection of Springfield Armory in Springfield, Massachusetts, USA. It is not on display.

== Replacement for the Meunier rifle ==
The Meunier Rifle eventually lost out to the simply designed gas-operated Mle 1917 RSC semi-automatic rifle, which was built in large numbers (86,000) during 1918. The Mle 1917 RSC was adopted because it was less expensive to manufacture since it used standard Mle 1886 M93 Lebel rifle components, notably: the barrel, stock, forend, barrel bands and trigger guard. Furthermore, the Model 1917 RSC fired the standard 8mm Lebel ammunition loaded on special five round clips. The Meunier rifle, being long recoil operated like the Remington Model 8 rifle, was mechanically more complex and only fired special 7mm high-power, rimless ammunition.

== Museum displays/surviving examples ==
The Meunier A6 rifle can be seen at the Musée de l'Armée, Les Invalides, Paris, France, as a part of the permanent WWI (1914–1918) arms, uniforms and equipment displays. The Meunier A6 in their collection has been deactivated by drilling a hole in the chamber; it is no longer functional.

No Meunier A6 rifles are on display in museums anywhere in the United States or Canada. The Springfield Armory in Massachusetts, USA, has in their archives a single Meunier A6 carbine, a trials version manufactured by cutting down a full length A6 rifle.

== See also ==
- Fusil Automatique Modèle 1917

== Citations ==
1. "French autoloading rifles. 1898-1979 (Proud promise), by Jean Huon, 1995, Collector Grade Publications. ISBN 0-88935-186-4. This volume (in English) contains a detailed technical chapter describing the Lebel rifle and its ammunition. This volume primarily describes all French semi-automatic rifles since 1898, notably the Mle 1917 and Mle 1918 semi-automatic rifles, the Meunier (A6) rifle as well as the MAS 38-40 to MAS49 and 49/56 series.
2. "La Manufacture Nationale d'Armes de Châtellerault(1819-1968)", Claude Lombard, 1987, Brissaud, 162 Grande Rue, Poitiers, ISBN 2-902170-55-6 . This illustrated volume (in French) contains the production statistics for the Lebel rifle as well as complete technical accounts on the Gras, Kropatschek, Lebel and Berthier weapons and how they came to be designed and manufactured. This is regarded as the fundamental research volume on the subject. The author is a retired armament engineer who spent most of his career at Châtellerault and had full access to all the archives and the prototypes.
3. "Military rifle and machine gun cartridges", Jean Huon, 1988, Ironside International Publishers, Alexandria, Virginia, ISBN 0-935554-05-X. This volume (in English) provides a detailed description of all the types of 8mm Lebel ammunition, including the Balle D (a.m.). The 7x59 mm Meunier cartridge (for the semi-automatic A6 Meunier rifle) is also illustrated and described in detail.
4. "Standard Catalog of Military Firearms", Ned Schwing, 2003, Krause Publications, ISBN 0-87349-525-X. Contains an informative and detailed page dedicated to the Lebel rifle (by David Fortier).
5. "The Chauchat Machine Rifle (Honour Bound), Gerard Demaison and Yves Buffetaut, 1995, Collector Grade Publications, ISBN 0-88935-190-2, The 10 pages illustrated appendix at the end of this volume (in English) exhaustively describes all the 8mm Lebel ball ammunition types, plus the less well-known blank, tracer, armor-piercing, incendiary, dummy and proof rounds. This appendix was documented and authored by internationally-known cartridge expert Dr Ph. Regenstreif.
6. Bolt Action Rifles, Frank de Haas and Wayne Van Zwoll, 2003, Krause Publications, ISBN 0-87349-660-4. An illustrated chapter in this volume reviews in depth the Lebel and Berthier rifles (and carbines).

== General and cited references ==
- Barnes, Frank C., Cartridges of the World, DBI Books Inc., 1989.
- Clinton Ezell, Edward, Small arms of the world, Eleventh Edition, Arms & Armour Press, London, 1977.
- Ferrard, Stéphane. France 1940 l'armement terrestre, ETAI, 1998, ISBN 2-7268-8380-X.
- Gotz, Hans Dieter, German Military Rifles and Machine Pistols, 1871–1945, Schiffer Publishing, Ltd. West Chester, Pennsylvania, 1990. OCLC 24416255.
- Huon, Jean, French Autoloading Rifles (Proud Promise) 1898–1979, 1995, Collector Grade Publications, ISBN 0-88935-186-4
- Huon, Jean, Les fusils d'assaut français (The French Assault Rifles), published by Editions Barnett in 1998, ISBN 2-9508308-6-2
- Smith, W. H. B, Small arms of the world: the basic manual of military small arms, Harrisburg, Pa.: Stackpole Books, 1955. OCLC 3773343.
- Wollert, Günter; Reiner Lidschun; Wilfried Kopenhagen, Illustrierte Enzyklopädie der Schützenwaffen aus aller Welt: Schützenwaffen heute (1945–1985), Berlin: Militärverlag der Deutschen Demokratischen Republik, 1988. OCLC 19630248.
- Action Guns
- AMI
- Armi & Tiro
- American Handgunner
- Cibles
- Deutsches Waffen Journal
- Diana Armi
- Gazette des Armes
- Guns & Ammo
- Internationales Waffen Magazin
- Schweizer Waffen Magazin
- SWAT Magazine
- Visier
