= Rossignol ENT =

Rossignol machine rifle
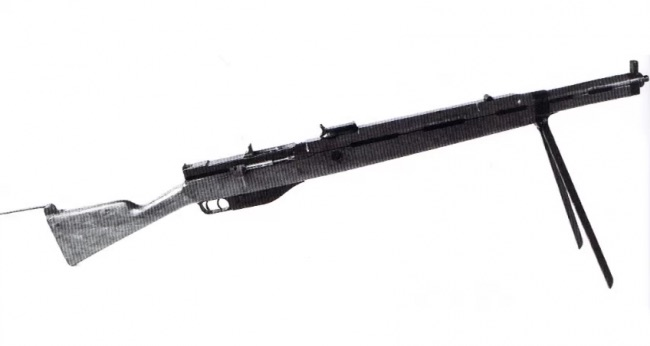
- The Rossignol ENT experimental automatic rifle
- Type: Automatic rifle
- Place of origin: France

Production history
- Designer: Rossignol
- Designed: 1896
- Manufacturer: ENT

Specifications
- Mass: 9.7kg
- Cartridge: 6×60mm
- Caliber: 6mm
- Action: Gas

The Rossignol ENT was an experimental automatic rifle of French origin from around the first years of the 20th century. It was the first rifle which used the direct impingement operating system, which found later use in the Swedish Ag m/42, the French 1940 MAS and, most notably, the AR-10 and AR-15 series of rifles.

Rossignol developed the new impingement system, and modified the Friberg-Kjellman system of opposing, retractable bolt lugs for this experimental rifle. The rifle was produced under the École Normale de Tir, thus the ENT designation, and was produced in at least four variants, "ENT No. 1 or B1, B2, B4, B5".

== Specifications ==
- Cartridge: 6×60mm
- Caliber: 6mm
- Weight: 9.7 kg
- Operation: Gas direct-impingement
