= 95 S 58-61 =

Finnish recoilless rifle

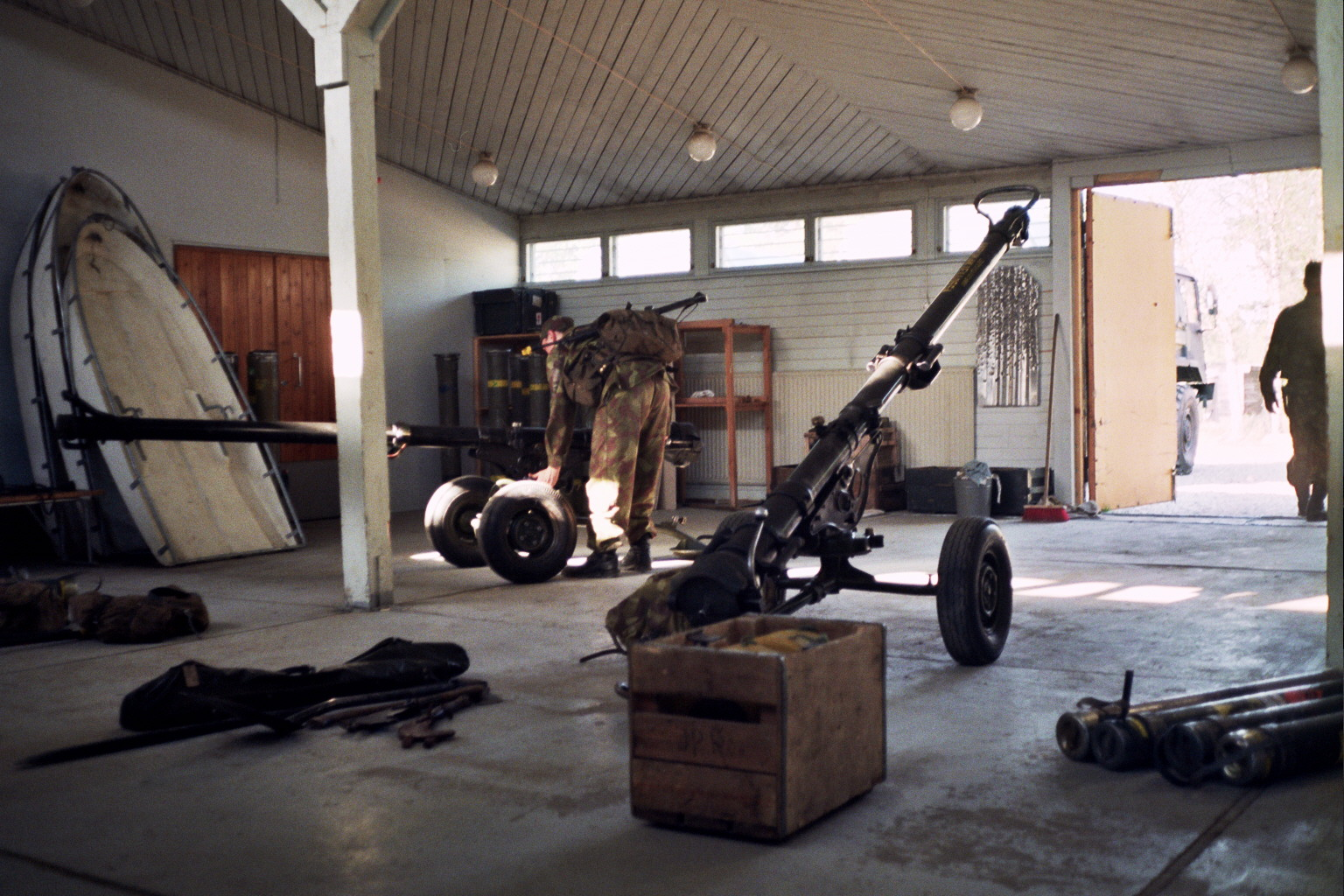
Two 95 S 58-61 recoilless rifles and related equipment

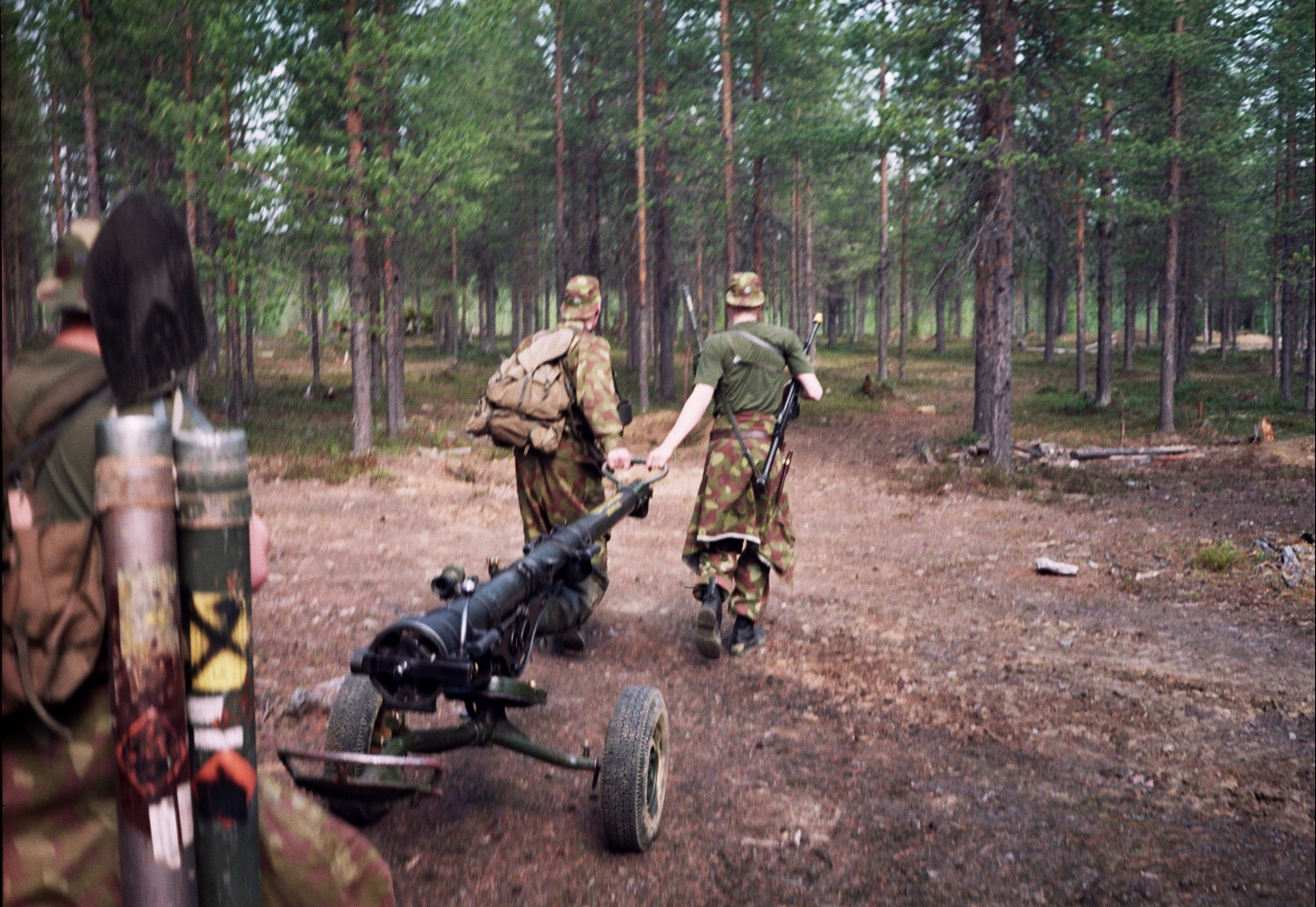
Finnish conscripts in a training exercise, marching with a heavy recoilless rifle. Image from 1997.

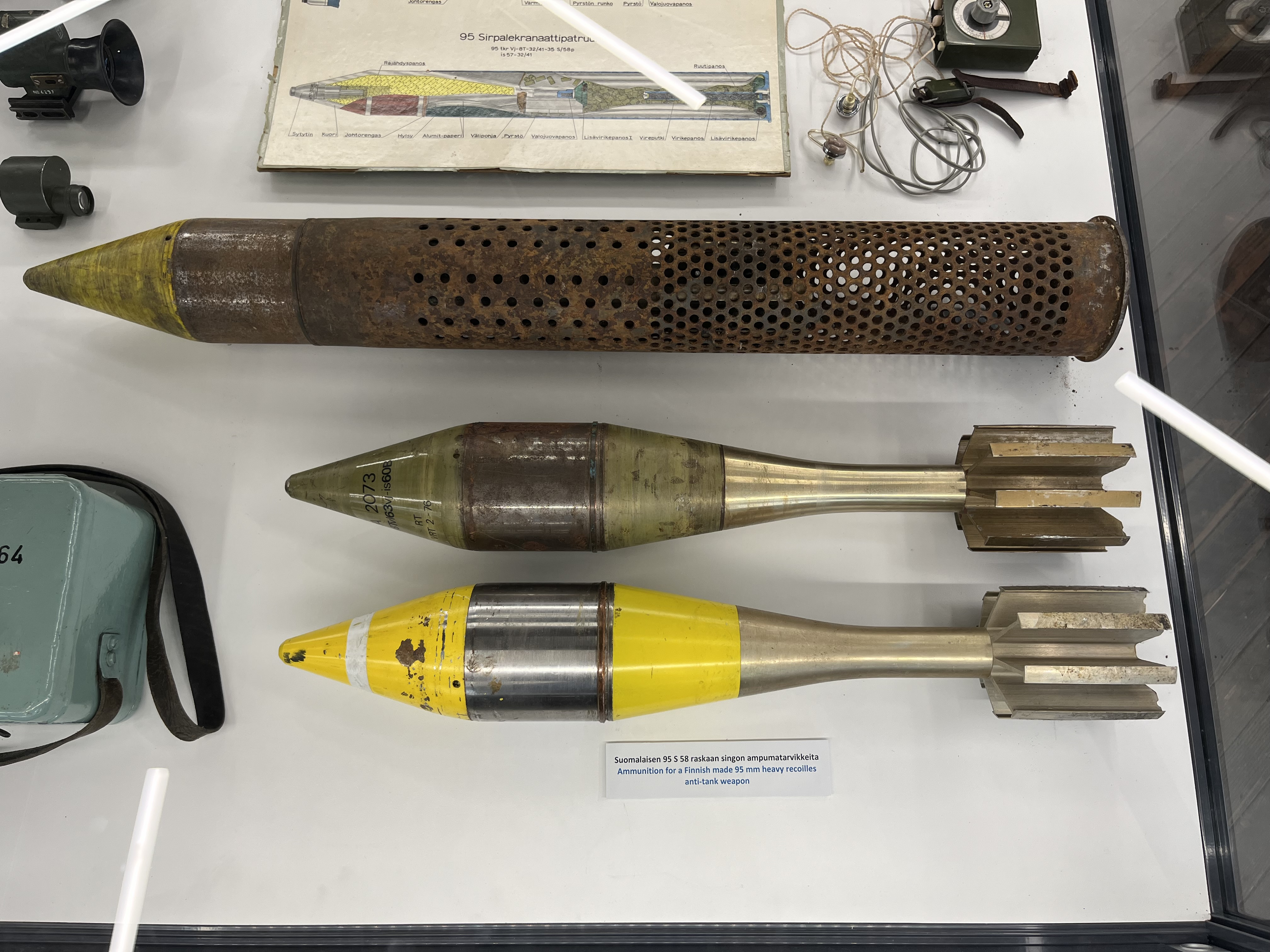
Ammunition for the 95 S 58-61.

The 95 S 58-61 is a heavy recoilless anti-tank weapon used by the Finnish Army. It is also referred to as raskas sinko (heavy recoilless rifle), or colloquially as Musti ("Mutt"). The weapon was developed in 1958 (version 95 S 58) and it was given a new wheel-equipped carriage in 1961. The name of the weapon means "95 mm, Sinko, model 1958/1961", where sinko is the Finnish word for recoilless weapon.

The weight of the weapon system is 140 kg and its caliber is 95 mm (3.75 inches). Its effective range is 700 m against moving targets and 1,000 m against positioned targets. It can penetrate about 550 mm steel. Its HEAT ammunition is equipped with a strengthened nose section to better its effectiveness against explosive reactive armour (ERA).

The weapon team consists of 8 men: leader, gunner, loader/reserve gunner and two ammunitions handlers plus the reserve leader and two extra men armed with M72 LAWs and APILAS (currently being replaced by the 102 RSLPSTOHJ NLAW) anti-tank weapons for close defense. The group moves in the terrain to their firing position by running and pulling the weapon behind them, and this is popularly called "walking the Musti". (Musti is a stereotypical name for a dog in Finnish.)

== Obsolescence ==
As of 2011 the weapon was considered to be among the oldest weapon systems in need of modernization by the Finnish Defense Forces.

== See also ==
- 55 S 55
- M40 recoilless rifle
