= MAS-49 rifle =

MAS-49
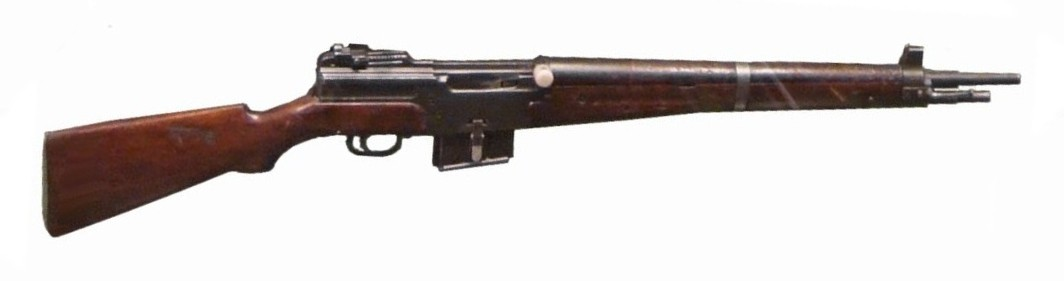
- Syrian contract MAS-49 rifle
- Type: Semi-automatic rifle
- Place of origin: France

Service history
- In service: 1951–1979 (as standard French service rifle)
- Used by: See Users
- Wars: First Indochina War; Algerian War; Suez Crisis; Cyprus Emergency; 1958 Lebanon Crisis; Vietnam War; Laotian Civil War; Cambodian Civil War; Rhodesian Bush War; Eritrean War of Independence; Chadian Civil War; Shaba II; Lebanese Civil War; Syrian Civil War

Production history
- Manufacturer: Manufacture d'armes de Saint-Étienne
- Produced: 1949–1965
- No. built: ~80,000 (MAS-49); 275,240 (MAS-49/56)
- Variants: MAS-49; MAS-49/56; MAS-49 Syrian contract

Specifications
- Mass: 4.7 kg (10 lb 6 oz) (MAS-49); 4.1 kg (9 lb) (MAS-49/56)
- Length: 1100 mm (43.35 in) (MAS-49); 1020 mm (40.2 in) (MAS-49/56)
- Barrel length: 580 mm (22.8 in) (MAS-49); 525mm (20.7 in) (MAS-49/56)
- Cartridge: 7.5×54mm French.308 (Century Arms mass conversions)
- Caliber: 7.5 mm
- Action: Direct impingement gas operation, tilting bolt
- Rate of fire: Semi-automatic
- Muzzle velocity: 820 m/s (2,690 ft/s)
- Effective firing range: 400 m (437 yd); 800 m (875 yd) (with telescopic sight)
- Feed system: 10-round detachable box magazine
- Sights: Iron sights adjustable from 200 to 1,200 m (660 to 3,940 ft); Removable APX(SOM) telescopic sights

The MAS-49 is a French semi-automatic rifle that replaced various bolt-action rifles as the French service rifle that was produced from 1949. It was designed and manufactured by the government-owned MAS arms factory. The formal French Army designation of the MAS-49 is Fusil semi-automatique 7 mm 5 M. 49 ("semi-automatic rifle of 7.5 mm model 1949").

Overall, the MAS-49 and 49/56 rifles gained the reputation of being accurate, reliable and easy to maintain in adverse environments. All the MAS-49 and 49/56 rifles feature a rail on the left side of their receivers to accommodate a designated rifle scope.

The MAS-49 and MAS-49/56 were replaced as French service rifles by the FAMAS assault rifle starting in 1979.

== History ==
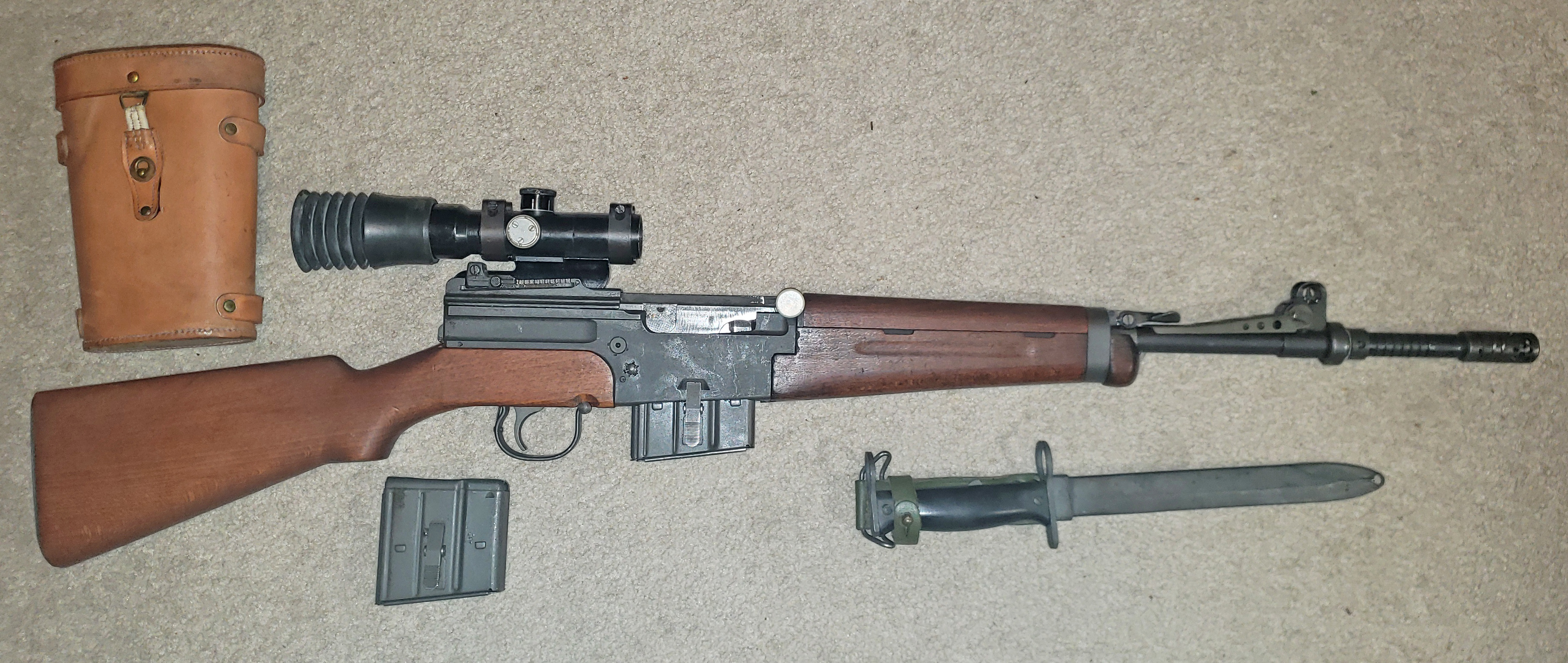
MAS Mle. 1949–56 with APX Scope, Scope Case, and Bayonet

The MAS-49 arrived after a series of small, distinct design improvements. Today, this might be termed spiral development, where small elements are changed with successive models, rather than large significant changes. The MAS-49 semi-automatic rifle evolved from the prototype MAS-38/39 and from the MAS-40, and lastly from the post-war MAS-44 and its minor variants 44A, 44B and 44C. Although 50,000 MAS-44 rifles were ordered in January 1945, only 6,200 were delivered to the French Navy. The MAS-49 was formally adopted by the French Army in July 1949. Its final form the MAS 49-56 was the French service rifle until adoption of the FAMAS.

The precursor MAS-44 was produced in limited numbers (6,200 rifles), and was mostly issued to the French Navy's Commandos Marine operating in French Indochina. Approximately 80,000 MAS-49 rifles were produced in all, beginning in 1951 (the Syrian contract rifles are included in this number). (Note: According to Huon in Proud Promise—French Semiautomatic Rifles: 1898–1979, p.160, only 20,600 MAS-49s were manufactured.) The production of the MAS-49 was cut short because the United States provided 200,000 M1 rifles and 210,000 M1 and M2 carbines to France between 1951-1960, lessening the need for semi-automatic rifle manufacture in France. The MAS-49/56 was manufactured between 1958-1978: 275,240 units were produced in all.

As a service rifle, the MAS-49 replaced a diverse collection of aging bolt-action rifles (MAS-36, Lee–Enfield No4, M1903A3 Springfield, U.S. M1917, Berthier, and K98k) which had been absorbed into French service after the end of World War II. It saw significant service with French troops in the latter stages of the First Indochina War, as well as during the Algerian War and the Suez Crisis. The MAS-49 series had a reputation for reliability in conditions of poor maintenance, sometimes being cleaned with nothing more than rags and motor oil. The 49 and 49/56 series could also endure harsh service environments, seeing combat in Algeria, Djibouti, French Indochina, French Guiana, and the Battle of Kolwezi.

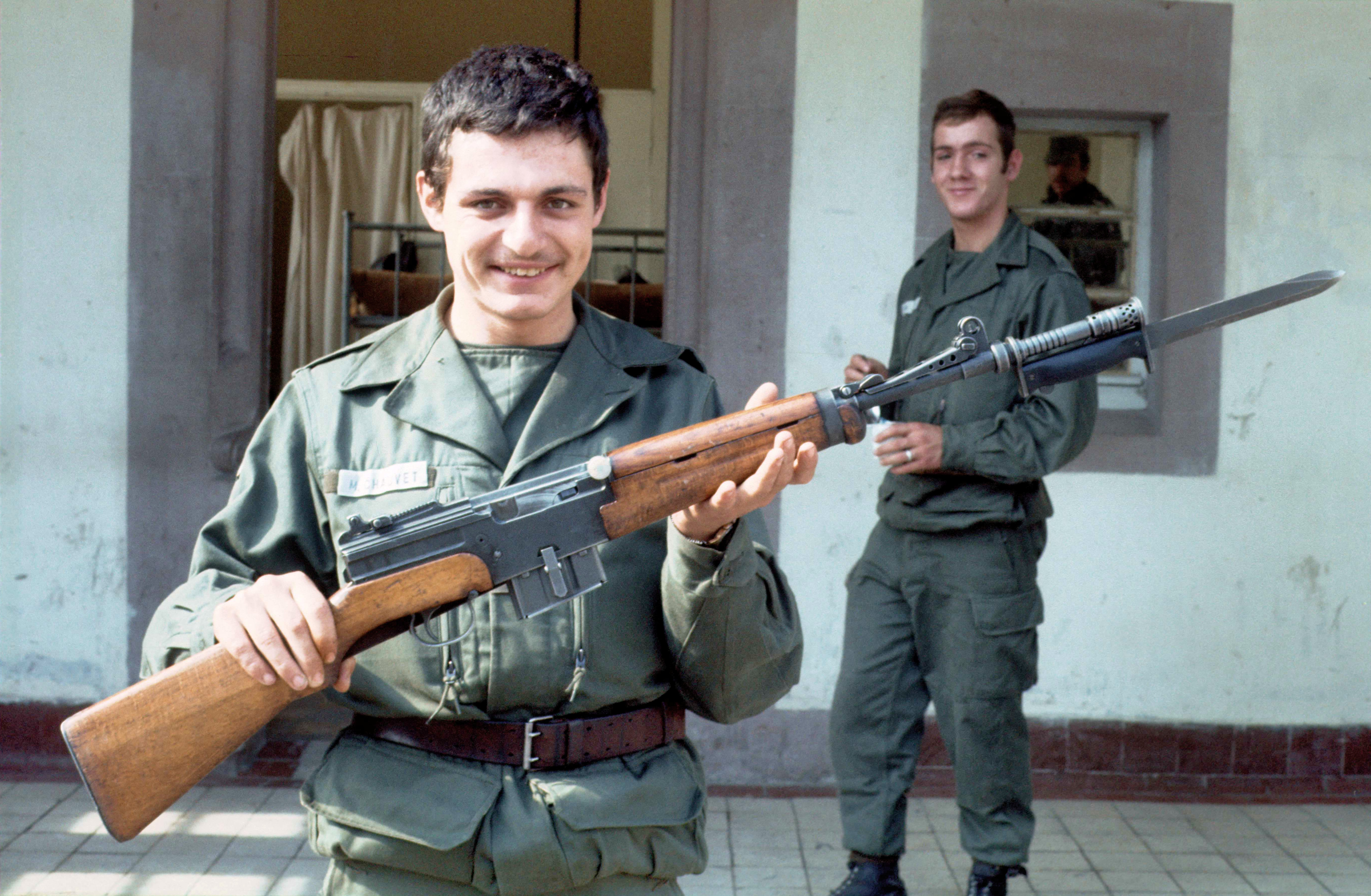
A French corporal showing a MAS-49/56, in 1976

An improved version called the MAS-49/56 was introduced in 1957 and incorporated lessons learned from service in Algeria, Indochina, and the Suez Crisis. The rifle was shortened and lightened to improve mobility for mechanized and airborne troops, and a knife bayonet was added. The MAS-49 built-in rifle grenade launcher was replaced by a combination compensator/rifle grenade launcher that fired NATO-standard 22mm rifle grenades. The rifle also incorporates an integral grenade launching sight that is attached to the front sight block and a gas cutoff that prevents gas from entering the gas tube from the gas port when firing grenade launching blank ammunition.

Attempts were made to replace the MAS-49, in the form of the MAS-54 and the FA-MAS Type 62, both 7.62×51mm NATO battle rifles, but neither were successful. The MAS-49/56 was replaced with the 5.56×45mm NATO caliber FAMAS bullpup assault rifle starting in 1978 and the last MAS-49/56 rifles were withdrawn from service by 1990.

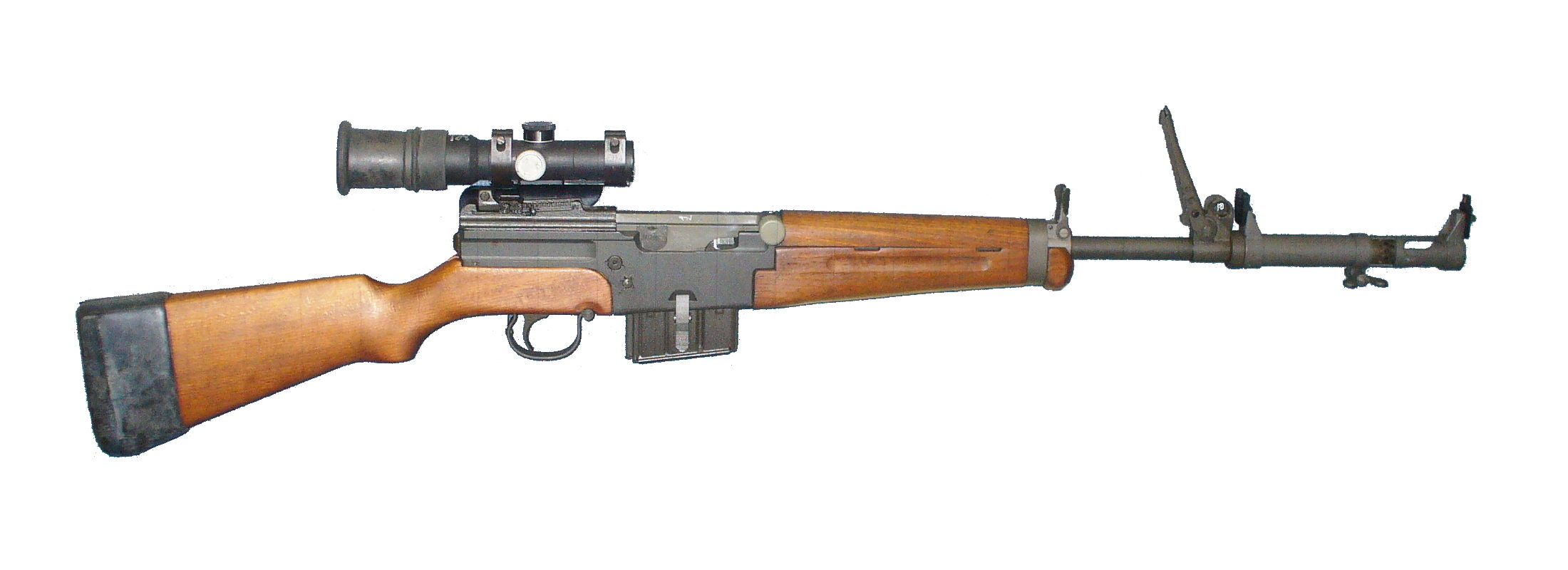
MAS-49/56 with APX(SOM) sight and night sight/flash suppressor attachment, grenade launching sight and gas cutoff both raised

== Design ==
The direct impingement gas system was first applied in 1901 to a 6 mm (0.24 in) semi-automatic experimental rifle (the ENT B-5) designed by Rossignol for the French military. Although several experimental prototypes using a tilting bolt and direct impingement had been tested by MAS since 1924, the immediate precursor to the MAS 7.5mm semi-automatic rifle series is the MAS-38/39. It was successfully tested in March 1939, just before World War II, and followed in May 1940 by the nearly identical MAS 1940. Similar direct impingement designs include the Swedish semi-automatic Ag m/42 adopted in 1942, and the US M16 select-fire rifle adopted in 1963. In the Ag m/42 and MAS systems, gas is vented from a port on top of the barrel through a small diameter tube to a hollow located on the front face of the bolt carrier. The contained forces of the gases move the carrier to the rear against the operating spring pressure with enough momentum to open the bolt, and within a short distance the end of the tube is exposed vent to the atmosphere. The M16 system vents gas from the barrel through a tube and into the body of the bolt carrier where it expands. Rings on the bolt body form a seal and the expanding gases move the bolt carrier to the rear, which starts the bolt opening cycle. The spent gases then vent through now exposed holes in the side of the bolt carrier.

The MAS system has the advantage of not depositing gas fouling on the bolt itself, a separate part located underneath the bolt carrier. All the French MAS 7.5mm semi-automatic rifles mentioned herein feature a rear-locking tilting bolt, as on the M1895 Colt–Browning machine gun, the Browning Automatic Rifle (1918), the MAS-1924 to MAS-1928 experimental semi-auto rifles, and the Russian Simonov SVT-38 (1938) and SVT-40 (1940) rifles. The MAS direct impingement design reduced the number of bolt moving parts to only six: the bolt carrier, then the rear locking tilting bolt which carries the extractor, the ejector and the firing pin, and lastly the recoil spring. It takes only a few seconds to disassemble the entire bolt mechanism for cleaning.

The same 10-round detachable magazine fits the MAS-44, MAS-49 and MAS-49/56 rifles. The earlier MAS-40 (1940) rifle had a 5-round magazine within the receiver, as on the bolt action MAS-36 rifle. The rifle can still be fed by stripper clips, and have a stripper clip guide built into the bolt face. Lastly, the MAS-49 and MAS-49/56 are equipped with a rail on the left side of the receiver. It allows for the immediate installation of a "Modele 1953" APX L 806 (SOM) 3.85 power telescopic sight by sliding it into place and then locking it in with a small pressure lever. The MAS-49 and MAS-49/56 are capable of consistently hitting individual man-size targets up to 400 m (1,300 ft) with the adjustable peep sight and up to 800 m (2,600 ft) with the APX L 806 telescopic sight. The bore is counter sunk at the muzzle to protect the rifling and preserve accuracy. The barrel is freely floating.

=== Syrian contract rifles ===
Syria contracted with MAS for 6,000 MAS-49 rifles. These rifles, along with 12,000 MAS-36 rifles and a production facility for 7.5×54mm ammunition were delivered in the early 1950s. The MAS-49 was used until the mid-late 1960s when they were replaced with AK-47 assault rifles. Syrian contract rifles differed from the French service model by having a spike bayonet identical to that of the MAS-36, as well as different stocks and metal parts to incorporate this change.

These rifles are dated 1953 and features serial numbers in the F33.000 to F39.000 range.

== Users ==
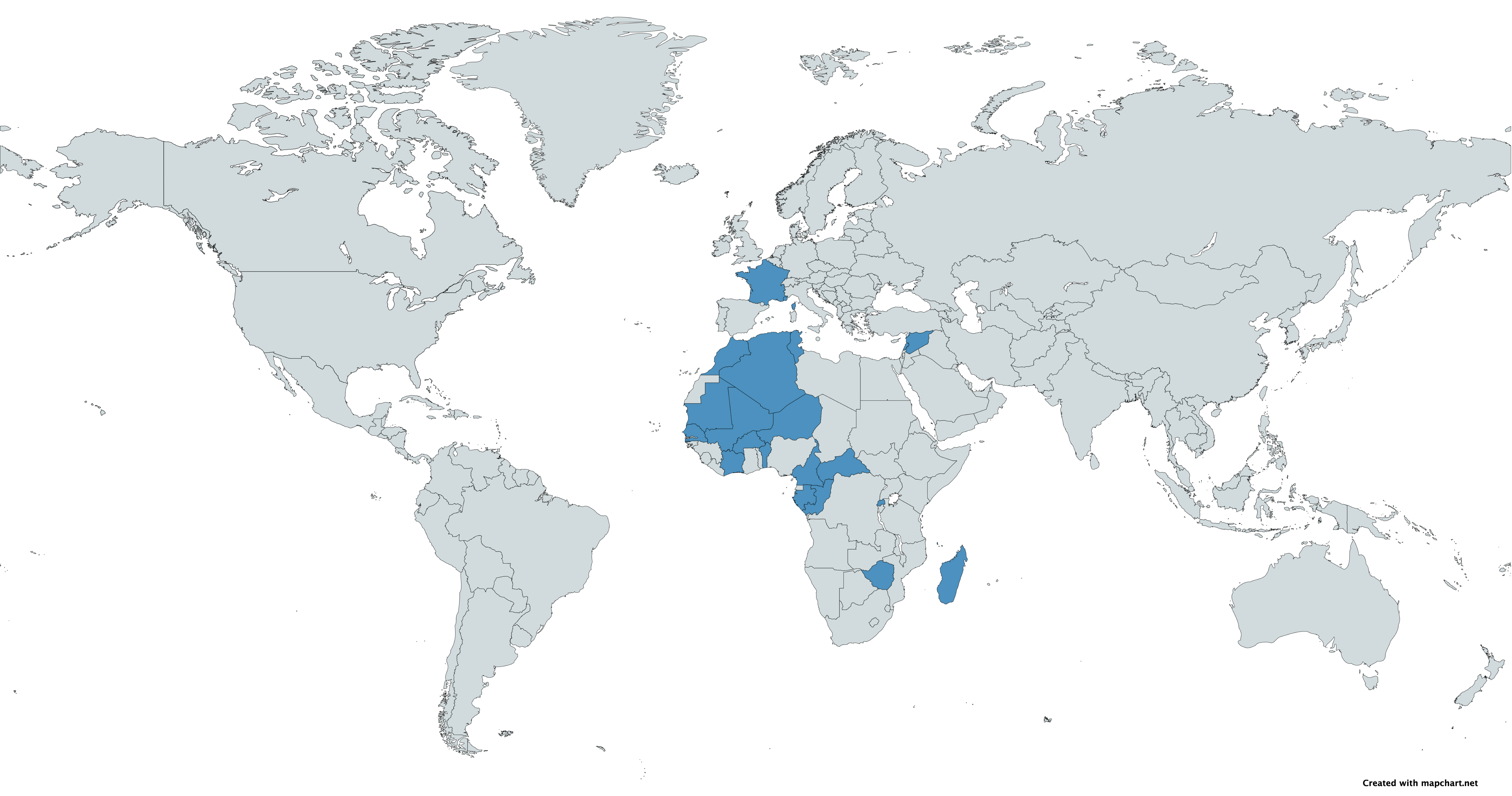
Map with MAS-49 users in blue

- Algeria
- Benin: MAS-49/56
- Burkina Faso: MAS-49/56
- Cameroon: MAS-49/56
- Central African Republic: 60 MAS-49/56 in service in 1963 with Gendarmerie
- Comoros: MAS-49/56
- Congo: MAS-49/56
- France
- Ivory Coast: MAS-49/56
- Gabon: MAS-49/56
- Lebanon: MAS-49 and MAS-49/56
- Madagascar
- Mali: MAS-49/56
- Mauritania: MAS-49/56
- Monaco: Compagnie des Carabiniers du Prince: MAS-49
- Morocco: MAS-49/56
- Niger: MAS-49/56
- Rwanda: MAS-49/56
- Senegal: MAS-49/56
- Seychelles: MAS-49/56
- Syria
- Tunisia: MAS-49 and MAS-49/56
- Zimbabwe

=== Non-state users ===
- (Eritrea) Eritrean Liberation Front: obtained some MAS-49/56 via French Djibouti
- (Greece) EOKA: stolen MAS-49 were used during the Cyprus Emergency

== See also ==
- Fusil Automatique Modele 1917—Earlier French Army semiautomatic rifle
- FN Model 1949

== Notes ==
Preceded by Fusil Berthier; Fusil MAS-36	French Army rifle 1951–1979	Succeeded by FAMAS
