= Direct impingement =

Type of gas operation for a firearm

Direct impingement

Direct impingement is a type of gas operation for a firearm that utilizes gas from a fired cartridge to impart force on the bolt carrier or slide assembly to cycle the action. Firearms using direct impingement are theoretically lighter, more accurate, and less expensive than firearms using cleaner and cooler gas piston systems.

== Advantages ==
Firearms with a direct impingement design can, in principle, be constructed lighter than piston-operated designs. Because high-pressure gas acts directly upon the bolt and carrier in a direct impingement system, it does not need a separate gas cylinder, piston, and operating rod assembly of a conventional piston-operated system, only requiring a gas tube to channel gas from the barrel back towards the action. This saves weight, lowers manufacturing costs, and reduces the mass of the operating parts, and thereby the wear on mechanical parts due to movement. By removing the gas piston, the potential amount of moving mass is also lowered, decreasing the potential for firearm movement and barrel distortion before the bullet leaves the barrel.

The gas directed at the bolt carrier group may improve reliability in some conditions. The jet of gas can blow debris away from the ejection port which, in other designs, could enter the mechanism and foul the gun.

== Disadvantages ==
The main disadvantage of direct impingement is that the breech of the firing mechanism becomes fouled more quickly compared to long or short stroke piston systems. This is caused by the operating mechanism's direct exposure to gases from burned cartridge propellant when the firearm cycles. The gases contain vaporized metals, carbon, and impurities in a gaseous state until they condense on the relatively cooler operating parts. These deposits increase friction on the bolt's camming system, leading to malfunctions. Frequent and thorough cleaning is required to ensure reliability. The amount of fouling depends upon the rifle's design as well as the type of propellant powder used.

Another disadvantage of direct impingement is that combustion gases heat the bolt and bolt carrier as the firearm operates. This heating causes lubricant to be "burned off". Lack of proper lubrication is the most common cause of weapon malfunctions. These combined factors reduce service life of these parts, reliability, and mean time between failures.

== Variables ==
The operation of the system is highly dependent on both the length of the barrel and the gas tube which transports gas from the barrel to the bolt. Using too short a gas tube can result in increased pressure inside the bolt assembly and an increased rate of automatic fire, both of which can negatively affect the weapon and accuracy of shots. The use of a suppressor also increases gas pressure, further aggravating the situation. The problem can be reduced by using a longer gas tube, moving the gas port on the barrel further forward, and/or by installing an adjustable gas block to provide the right amount of gas pressure depending on the desired operating mode.

== History ==
The first experimental rifle using a direct impingement system was the French Rossignol ENT B1 automatic rifle followed by Rossignol's B2, B4 and B5. The first successful production weapon was the French MAS 40 rifle adopted in March 1940. The Swedish Automatgevär m/42 is another example. Both the French and Swedish rifles use a simple system whereby the gas tube acts as a piston with a cylinder recess in the bolt carrier.

=== Stoner bolt and carrier piston system ===
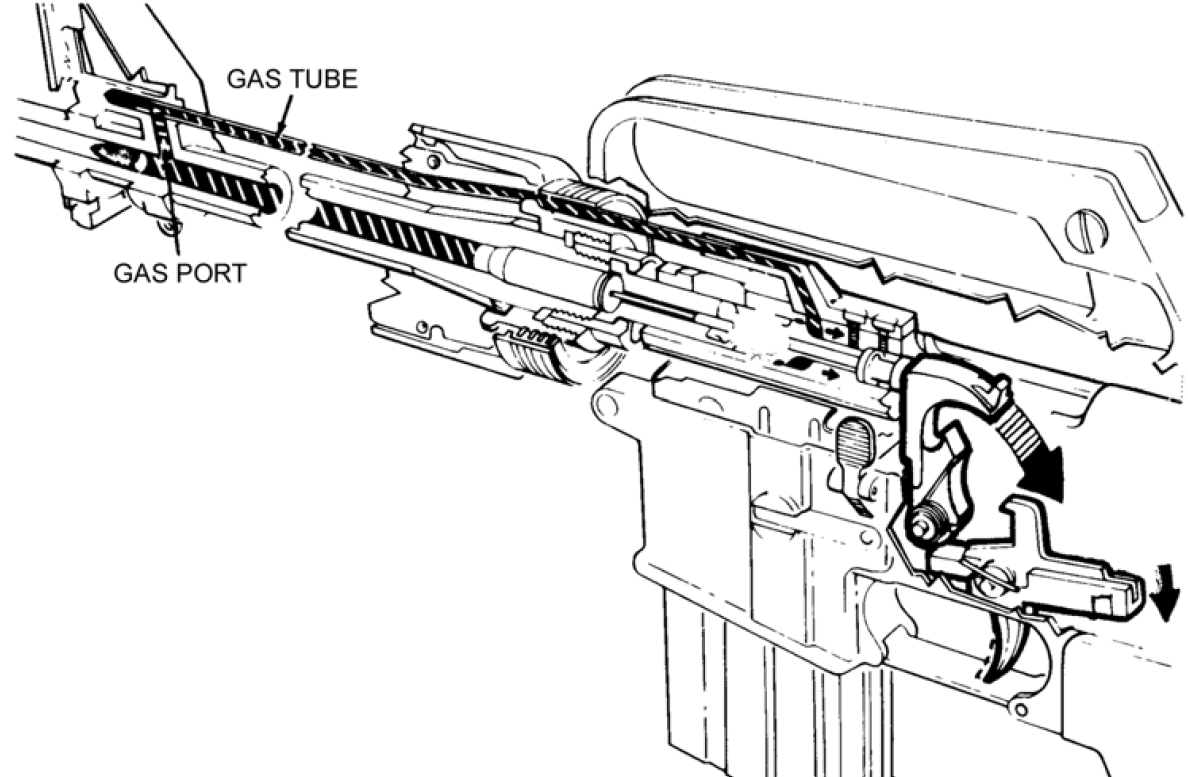
Stoner internal piston action system

The original AR-10 action designed by Eugene Stoner (later developed into the ArmaLite AR-15, M16 rifle, and M4 carbine) is commonly called a direct impingement system, but it does not actually utilize this mechanism. In U.S. patent 2,951,424, the designer states: "This invention is a true expanding gas system instead of the conventional impinging gas system." Gas is routed from a port in the barrel through a gas tube, directly to a chamber inside the bolt carrier. The bolt within the bolt carrier is fitted with piston rings to contain the gas. In effect, the bolt and carrier act as a gas piston and cylinder. The subtleties involved in ArmaLite's patent on the gas system significantly diverge from classical direct impingement; upon firing, the pressurized propellant gasses exit the barrel via the gas port and travel the length of the gas tube, but instead of simply applying the inertia necessary to cycle the weapon directly to the bolt carrier, the gas is funneled inside the bolt carrier, wherein the increase in pressure results in the bolt itself acting as a piston, forcing the bolt carrier away from the barrel face.

== See also ==
- Glossary of firearms terminology
- Gas-delayed blowback
- Repeating rifle

== Sources ==
- Centre des archives de l'armement, Châtellerault. National Armament Archives Center.
- Huon, Jean. Proud Promise—French Semiautomatic Rifles: 1898-1979, Collector Grade Publications,1995,ISBN 0-88935-186-4
- United States Patent Office, Patent No. 2951424 - Gas Operated Bolt and Carrier System, Sep 6 1960.
