= Automatgevär m/42 =

Ag m/42
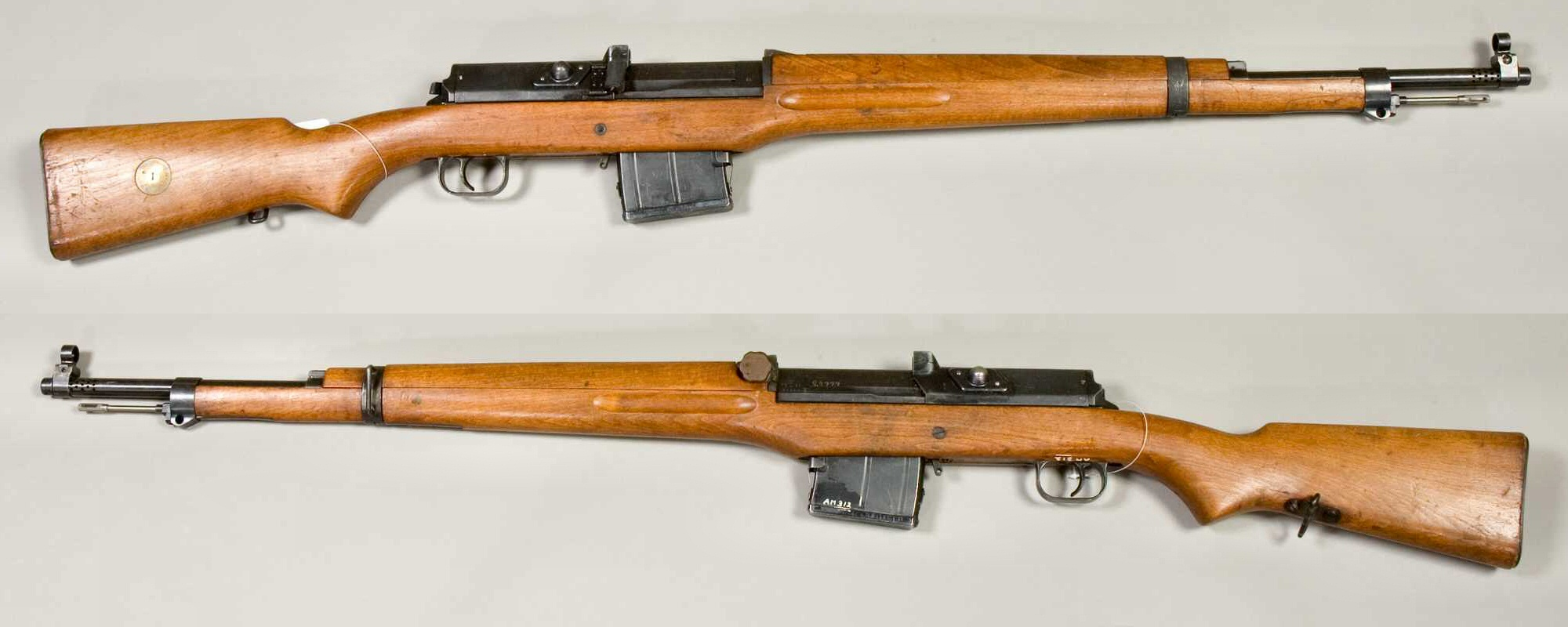
- 6.5 mm Automatgevär m/1942B
- Type: Semi-automatic rifle
- Place of origin: Sweden

Service history
- In service: 1942–1960s (Sweden)
- Used by: See Users

Production history
- Designer: Erik Eklund
- Designed: 1941
- Manufacturer: Carl Gustafs Stads Gevärsfaktori
- No. built: 30,000
- Variants: Ag m/42B

Specifications
- Mass: 4.71 kg (10.4 lb) unloaded & without bayonet
- Length: 1,214 mm (47.8 in)
- Barrel length: 622 mm (24.5 in)
- Cartridge: 6.5×55mm
- Caliber: 6.5 mm Groove diameter: 6.71 mm (0.264")
- Action: Direct impingement gas operation
- Rate of fire: 40 (rd/min)
- Effective firing range: 100–600 m sight adjustments for m/94 ammunition 100–800 m sight adjustments for m/41 ammunition
- Feed system: 10-round box magazine

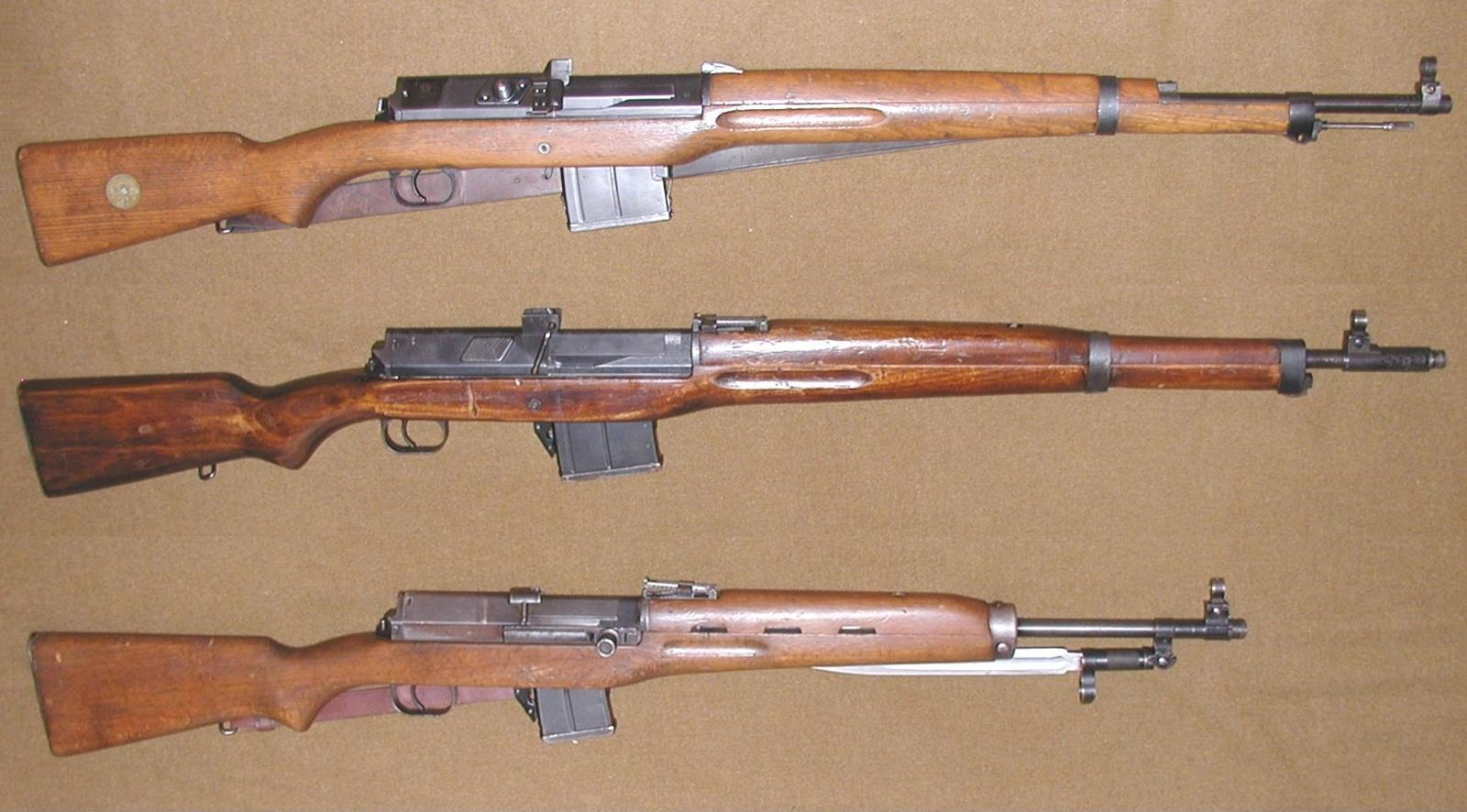
Top to bottom: Swedish Ag m/42B rifle, Egyptian Hakim rifle, Egyptian Rasheed carbine

The Automatgevär m/42 (Ag m/42, outside of Sweden commonly known as the AG 42, AG-42 or Ljungman) is a Swedish semi-automatic rifle which saw limited use by the Swedish Army from 1942 until the 1960s.

== History ==
During the Winter War, Finland captured a number of SVT-38 rifles, and at least one found its way to Sweden. The Ag m/42 was designed by Erik Eklund of the AB C.J. Ljungmans Verkstäder company of Malmö, loosely following SVT mechanics around 1941, and entered production at the Carl Gustafs Stads Gevärsfaktori in Eskilstuna in 1942. Some 30,000 rifles were manufactured in all for the Swedish Army.

This was a relatively small number of weapons and the standard infantry rifle remained the 6.5 mm bolt-action m/96 Mauser.

Norwegian "police troops" trained in Sweden during World War II were issued a number of Ag m/42s and brought these rifles to Norway when the Germans surrendered in 1945. These rifles were never modified to the later Ag m/42B version.

After a number of issues had been discovered, including a serious problem with rusting gas tubes, the existing stocks of the rifle were modified between 1953 and 1956, and the reworked rifles were designated Ag m/42B. Modifications included a stainless-steel gas tube, adding two ergonomic gripping knobs on the breech cover, a new manual safety to prevent breech cover induced hand injuries, a new elevation knob for the rear sight, a rubber case-deflector, a revised magazine release and a new cleaning rod. The Ag m/42B was replaced in Swedish service in the mid 1960s by the Ak 4 (derived from the Heckler & Koch G3).

In the early 1950s, the Ag m/42B manufacture license was sold to Egypt resulting in the Hakim rifle, which uses the 7.92×57mm Mauser cartridge. Sweden sold the machinery to Egypt and the Hakim was therefore built with the same machine tools used for the Ag m/42B.

After being re-chambered to 7.62 NATO and having its trajectory adjusted, the Ag m/42 was used as a ranging gun on the Swedish anti-tank gun Pansarvärnspjäs 1110 under the designation Inskjutningsgevär 5110.

Madsen tried to license the Ag m/42, but it never got beyond prototype stages.

Swedish troops serving under UNFICYP have used the m/42.

== Design ==
The Ag m/42 is operated by means of a direct impingement gas system, similar to that of the later, French MAS-49 rifle. The Ag m/42 also uses a tilting breech block like the Tokarev SVT-38/SVT-40, the MAS-49 and FN FAL rifles. The Ag m/42 is ammunition specific since it does not have an adjustable gas port or valve to adjust the rifle to various propellant and projectile specific pressure behavior.

The Ag m/42 was designed and adopted at a time when the Swedish military introduced new service ball ammunition. To enable the rifle to be correctly used with new and old service ball ammunition at various ranges, the rear sight has two user interchangeable bullet drop compensation (BDC) options. One BDC cam wheel is calibrated for spitzer m/41 ammunition and one BDC cam wheel is calibrated for round-nose m/94 ammunition. Which BDC option is installed by the user can be seen between the sight screw and the range window. The bullet image (spitzer or round nose bullet) should match the ammunition used. With a hand adjustable elevation screw on the left side of the rear sight can be adjusted for bullet drop in 100 metres (109 yd) increments. The BDC option calibrated for round-nose m/94 ammunition offers 200 metres (219 yd) less maximum range setting.

=== Ammunition ===
==== Feeding ====
The Ag m/42 uses the 6.5×55mm cartridge loaded into a removable 10-round box magazine. In practice, however, the magazine usually remained attached to the rifle while it was loaded from the top with five-round stripper clips. Like the British Lee–Enfield and Soviet SVT-40, the Ag m/42's magazine was intended to be removed only for cleaning.

==== m/94 round-nosed ammunition ====
The ammunition used by the Swedish military from 1894 was 6.5×55mm skarp patron m/94 projektil m/94 (live cartridge m/94 projectile m/94) service ammunition with a 10.1 grams (156 gr) long round-nosed m/94 (B-projectile) bullet.

==== m/41 spitzer ammunition ====
From 1941 onwards Sweden, which remained neutral during World War II, adopted skarp patron m/94 prickskytte m/41 (live cartridge m/94 sniping m/41) ammunition loaded with a 9.1 grams (140 gr) spitzer bullet (D-projectile). Besides a pointed nose the m/41 D-projectile also had a boat tail to further reduce aerodynamic drag and replaced the m/94 ammunition loaded with the m/94 projectile for general use.

From 100 to 800 metres (109 to 875 yd) with m/41 spitzer ammunition, or 100 to 600 metres (109 to 656 yd) m with m/94 round-nose ammunition.

== Variants ==
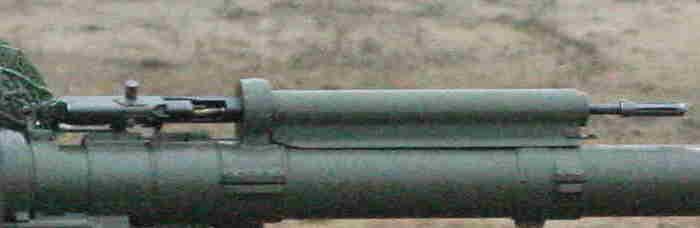
Inskjutningsgevär 5110

=== Ag m/42B ===
The Ag m/42B is a variant of the m/42 with a stainless steel gas tube.

=== Inskjutningsgevär 5110 ===
Ag m/42 modified into a 7.62 NATO caliber spotting rifle for the Pansarvärnspjäs 1110.

== Users ==
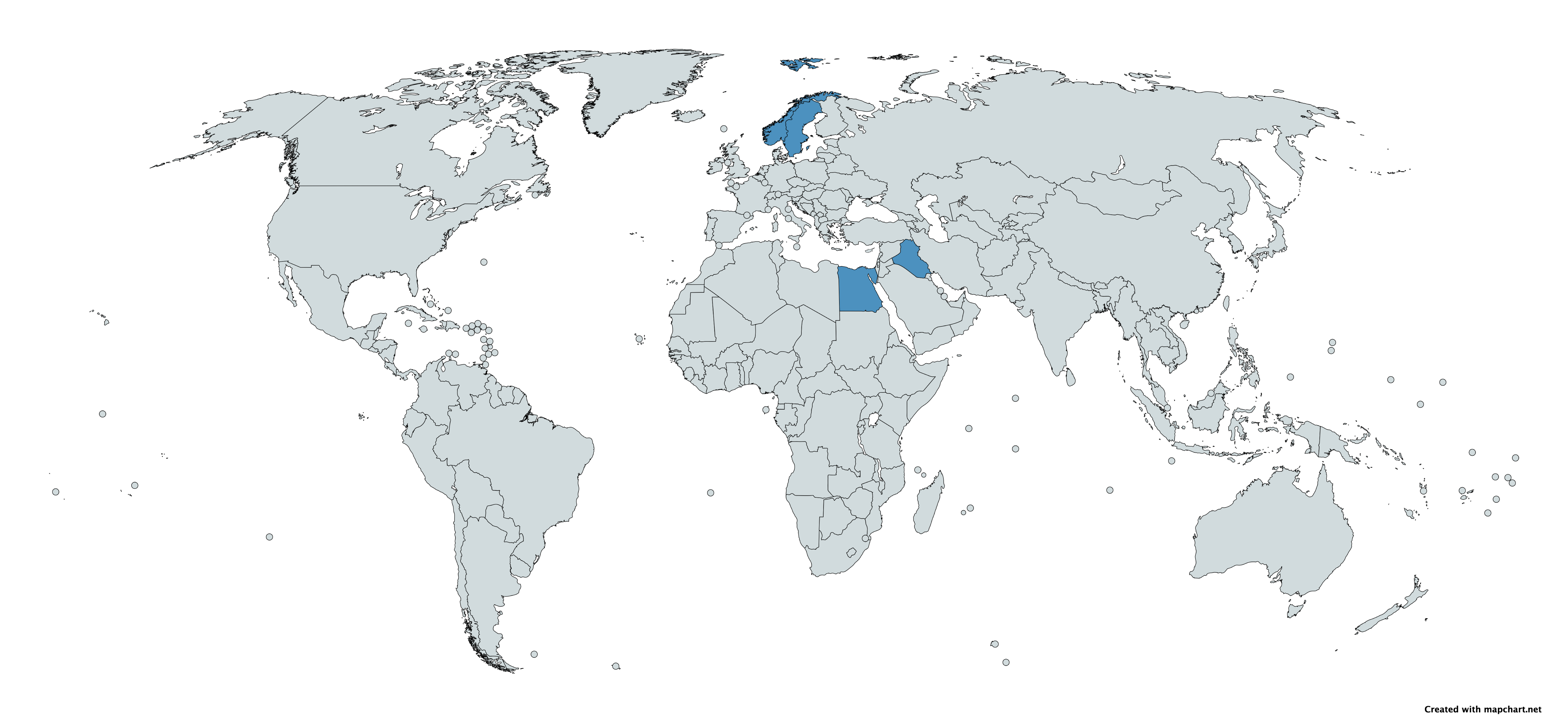
A map with AG-42 users in blue

- Egypt: Made under license as Hakim Rifle and Rasheed Carbine.
- Norway
- Sweden

=== Non-State Actors ===
- Official Irish Republican Army

== See also ==
- Kulsprutegevär m/40
- GRAM 63 battle rifle
- FM 1957 battle rifle
