= Table of handgun and rifle cartridges =

Small arms cartridge data

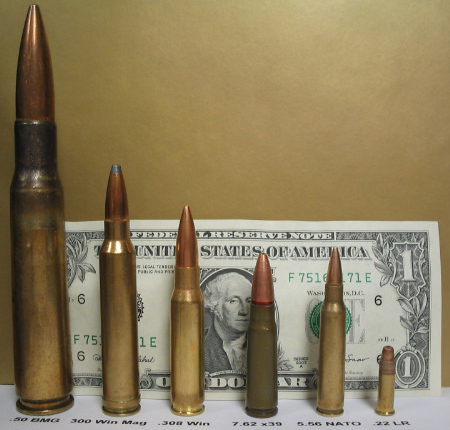
Common rifle cartridges, from the largest .50 BMG to the smallest .22 Long Rifle with a $1 United States dollar bill in the background as a reference point.

This is a table of selected pistol/submachine gun and rifle/machine gun cartridges by common name. Data values are the highest found for the cartridge, and might not occur in the same load (e.g. the highest muzzle energy might not be in the same load as the highest muzzle velocity, since the bullet weights can differ between loads).

== Legend ==
- Factory loadings. Number of manufacturers producing complete cartridges - e.g. Norma, RWS, Hornady, Winchester, Federal, Remington, Sellier & Bellot, Prvi Partizan. May be none for obsolete and wildcat cartridges.
- H/R: Handgun (H) or rifle (R) - dominant usage of the cartridge (although several dual-purpose cartridges exist)
- Size: Metric size - may not be official
- MV: Muzzle velocity, in feet-per-second
- ME: Muzzle energy, in foot-pounds
- P: Momentum, in pound (force) (lbf) times seconds. A guide to the recoil from the cartridge, and an indicator of bullet penetration potential. The .30-06 Springfield (at 2.064 lbf-s) is considered the upper limit for tolerable recoil for inexperienced rifle shooters.
- Chg: Propellant charge, in grains
- Dia: Bullet diameter, in inches
- BC: Ballistic coefficient, G1 model
- L: Case length (mm)

== Table ==
Name	Date	Nation	Factory loadings	H/R	Official size (mm)	MV (ft/s)	ME (ft⸳lbf)	P (lbf⸳s)	Chg (gr)	Actual diameter (in.)	BC	L	Comments
2 mm Kolibri	1914	Austria-Hungary	0	H	2.7×9mm	650	3	0.009		0.108		9mm	Obsolete. Smallest round ever manufactured.
4.6×30mm	2000	Germany		H	4.6×30mm	2410	400	0.332		0.183		30mm	Bottlenecked high velocity PDW cartridge designed by Heckler & Koch in conjunction with the Heckler & Koch MP7 personal defense weapon.
5 mm Remington Rimfire Magnum	1970	US	0	R	5×26mm	2100	327	0.311		0.205		26mm	Obsolete. Rimfire.
5.45×18mm	1973	USSR	1	H	5.45×18mm	1000	94			0.222		18mm	Developed for PSM pistol.
5.45×39mm	1974	USSR	1	R	5.45×39mm	2810	1052	0.749		0.215		39mm	Developed for AK-74.
5.56×45mm NATO	1960	US		R	5.56×45mm	3130	1196	0.764	28.5	0.224	0.395	45mm	Militarized .223 Rem.
5.56×45mm NATO SS109	1979	Belgium	3	R	5.56×45mm	2864	1196	0.764	28.5	0.224		45mm	NATO (1980), 2nd gen. Current NATO service including M16 rifle, Steyr AUG, SA80, FAMAS, Heckler & Koch G36.
5.6mm Gw Pat 90	1987	Switzerland		R	5.56×45mm	3168	1243	0.622	28.5	0.224		45mm	Swiss military version of the 5.56×45mm NATO / 223 Remington. For SIG SG 550 and variants.
5.6×39mm	1961	USSR			5.6×39mm								aka .220 Russian
5.7×28mm	1990	Belgium	1	R	5.7×28mm	2800	400	0.286	13	0.224		28mm	Bottlenecked high velocity PDW cartridge designed by FN Herstal. Designed in response to NATO requests for a replacement for the 9×19mm cartridge. Frequently used in the FN Five-seven Pistol.
5.8×42mm DBP87	1987	China		R	5.8×42mm	3100	1395	0.9		0.236		42mm	Chinese service rifle QBZ-95
6×57mm Mauser	1895	Germany		R	6×57mm	2600				0.236		57mm	aka 6.2×57mm RWS. Necked down 6.5×57mm. The 6mm Remington is a carbon copy.
6×62mm Freres	1983	Germany	1	R	6×62mm	3460	2260			0.243		62mm	also 6×62mmR, based on 9.3×62mm case.
6mm Lee Navy	1895	US	0	R	6×60mmSR	2560	1629			0.236		60mm	Service cartridge of the United States Navy and Marine Corps from 1895
6 mm PPC	1975	US		R	6.17×38.5mm	3212	1660	1.034	31.7	0.243	0.376	38.5mm	Benchrest cartridge - "the most accurate round ever developed." .22 PPC case necked up to 6mm.
6mm Remington	1963	US	5	R	6.18×56.72mm	3235	2207	1.364	54.5	0.243	0.405	56.72mm	Same cartridge as .244 Remington and interchangeable. Rifles marked .244 Remington may not stabilize heaviest 6mm Remington bullets.
6mm BR Norma	1996	Sweden	3	R	6x39.6mm	2789				0.243	0.517	39.6mm	Norma's redesigned of the Remington 6mm BR in order to utilize VLD bullets.
6mm XC	2000	US	4	R	6×48mm	3018	1937			0.243	0.517	48mm	Developed by David Tubb for his Tubb 2000 rifle.
6mm ARC	2020	US	4	R	6.18x38mm	2750	1813			0.243	0.536	38mm	Developed as an intermediate cartridge between 223 and 308 with superior external ballistics in a smaller package.
6.5mm Creedmoor	2012	US	12	R	6.72×48.77mm	3050	2493	1.635	47.0	0.264	0.585	48.77mm	Uses the same bolt and magazines as 308 rifles, with higher velocity, accuracy, and lower recoil.
6.5×47mm Lapua	2005	Finland & Switzerland	3	R	6.5×47mm	2900				0.264	0.545	50mm	Specifically designed and optimized for 300-1000m competition.
6.5 Grendel	2003	US	2	R	6.5×39mm	2620	1875	1.431	32.0	0.264	0.509	39mm	Developed by Alexander Arms as a "low recoil, high accuracy, long-range cartridge for the AR-15 platform."
6.5mm JDJ	1978	US		H	6.5mm	2714	1635	1.205	38.5	0.264	0.509		.225 Winchester case necked up to 6.5mm and then blown out.
6.5×50mmSR Arisaka	1897	Japan	1	R	6.5×50SR	2717	1966		42	0.264		50mm	aka 6.5×50mm Japanese. Used in Arisaka Japanese service rifles.
6.5×52mm Mannlicher–Carcano	1891	Italy	3	R	6.50×52mm	2414	1818	1.506	43	0.264		52mm	
6.5×53mmR	1892	Austria-Hungary		R	6.5×53mmR	2650	2360	1.781	38	0.263		53mm	Romanian and Dutch service rifles
6.5×54mm MS	1908	Austria-Hungary	1	R	6.5×54mm	2395	1987	1.659		0.264		54mm	aka 6.5×54mm Mannlicher–Schönauer "Greek", based on 6.5×53mmR
6.5×54mm Mauser	1900	Germany		R	6.5×54mm	2362	1468			0.264		54mm	Once chambered for Kurz short-action carbines.
6.5-300 Weatherby Magnum	2016	US		R	6.7×72mm	3476	3487			0.264		72mm	
6.5×55mm	1895	Union of Sweden and Norway	7	R	6.5×55mm	2735	2325	1.7	52	0.264	0.509	55mm	aka 6.5×55 Swedish Mauser. BC=0.510.
6.5×57mm Mauser	1890	Germany	1	R	6.5×57mm	2772	2099	1.514		0.264		57mm	also 6.5×57mmR. a.k.a. 6.5×57mm RWS. Loaded by Prvi Partizan, RWS, and Sellier & Bellot
6.5×58mm Vergueiro	1904	Portugal		R	6.5×58mm	2775	2372	1.71	46	0.264		58mm	Portuguese service rifle 1904-1939
6.5×68mm	1939	Germany	1	R	6.5×68mm	3700	2983	1.612	73	0.265		68mm	aka 6.5×68mm RWS or Schuler (erroneously)
6.5mm STW	1999	US	0	R	6.5×72.39mm	3300				0.265		72.39mm	Wildcat by Layne Simpson.
6.8mm Remington SPC	2003	US	5	R	6.8×43mm	2570	1613	1.255	31.0	0.277	0.370	43mm	Developed by Remington with members of 5th Special Forces Group.
7mm-08 Remington	1980	US	6	R	7.2×51.7mm	2950	2686	1.821	50.4	0.284	0.531	51.7mm	.308 Winchester case necked down to 7mm.
7mm BR Remington	1978	US		R	7.21×55.6mm	2425	1525	1.258	34	0.284	0.531	55.6mm	6mm BR necked up to 7mm.
7mm Remington Magnum	1962	US	8	R	7.2×64mm	3240	3302	2.038	80.0	0.284	0.652	64mm	
7mm Remington Short Action Ultra Magnum	2004	US	1	R	7.23×51.69mm	3175	3221	2.029	68.0	0.284	0.414	51.69mm	
7mm Remington Ultra Magnum	2002	US	1	R	7.23×72.39mm	3425	3682	2.15	107.0	0.284	0.533	72.39mm	
7mm STW	1981	US	2	R	7.23×72.39mm	3325	3436	2.067	91.0	0.284	0.390	72.39mm	Belted.
7mm Weatherby Magnum	1944	US	2	R	7.22×64.74mm	3300	3501	2.122	81.8	0.284	0.525	64.74mm	Belted.
7mm WSM	2002	US	2	R	7.2×53.3mm	3647	3562	1.953	73.0	0.284	0.531	53.3mm	Winchester Short Magnum
7×57mm Mauser	1892	Germany	8	R	7×57mm	2740	2351	1.716	52.6	0.284	0.531	57mm	aka 7mm Mauser, a.k.a. .275 RIgby
7×64mm	1917	Germany	5	R	7.25×64mm	2950	2705	1.834	57.6	0.284	0.450	64.00mm	aka 7×64mm Brenneke.
7×65 R	1917	Germany	2	R	7.25×65mmR	2897	3075	2.123	83.6	0.285		65.00mm	aka 7×65mmR Brenneke
7.35×51mm Carcano	1938	Italy		R	7.35×51mm	2550	2175	1.706	41	0.298		51mm	aka 7.35mm Italian Carcano
7.5×55mm Swiss	1889	Switzerland	2	R	7.5×55mm	2839	2924	2.06	52.0	0.308		55mm	a.k.a. GP-11, 7.5×55mm Schmidt–Rubin.
7.5×57mm MAS	1924	France		R	7.57×57mm	2800	2397	1.712	54	0.308		57mm	8mm Lebel replacement. Rimless rifle cartridge. Same bullet diameter as .30-06. Short-lived due to confusion with 7.92mm Mauser.
7.5×54mm French	1929	France		R	7.57x54mm	2700	2232		58	0.308		54mm	Case-shortened 7.5×57mm MAS. Standard French rifle cartridge until the introduction of the FAMAS in 1979.
7.62×25mm Tokarev	1930	USSR	2	H	7.90×25mm	1857	650	0.7	10.6	0.311		25.00mm	Based on 7.63×25mm Mauser. Most famous for use in Tokarev TT pistol. Also used in several Soviet submachine guns, including the PPSh-41.
7.62×38mmR	1895	Russia	1	H	7.62×38mmR	1100	290	0.527	3	0.295		38mm	a.k.a. 7.62mm Nagant.
7.62×39mm	1943	USSR	6	R	7.62×39mm	2360	1521	1.289	31.5	0.312		39mm	Intermediate cartridge concept, following 7.92×33mm Kurz and preceding 5.56×45mm NATO. SKS and AK-47 USSR service rifles.
7.62×51mm NATO	1950	US	2	R	7.62×51mm	3165	2997	1.894	54.0	0.308	0.588	51mm	NATO (1953), T65. Current NATO service including M14 rifle, Heckler & Koch G3, FN FAL. Very similar to .308 Win.
7.62×54mmR	1891	Russia	5	R	7.62×54mm	2894	2713	1.875	52.6	0.308	0.462.	54mm	Designed for the Mosin–Nagant Russian service rifle. Oldest cartridge still in official military use, used in SVD Dragunov with Russia and the PSL rifles with many other countries.
7.63×25mm Mauser	1893	Germany	1	H	7.62×25mm	1410	375	0.532	6	0.308		25mm	aka 30 Mauser. Based on 7.65×25mm Borchardt. Most famous for use in Mauser C96 pistol. Basis for 7.62×25mm Tokarev round.
7.65×21mm Parabellum	1900	Germany	2	H	7.65×21mm	1085	325	0.599	4.2	0.309		21mm	a.k.a. 7.65 Parabellum, 7.65mm Luger, .30 Parabellum and (wrongly) .30 Luger.
7.7×58mm Arisaka	1939	Japan	1	R	7.7×58mm	2529	2510	1.985	55.0	0.311		58mm	aka 7.7×58mm Japanese Arisaka or 31 Jap
7.92mm DS	1934	Poland		R	7.92×107mm	4180	8740			0.322		107mm	Used for kbk ppanc wz.35 anti-tank rifle.
7.92×33mm Kurz	1938	Germany	1	R	7.92×33mm	2247	1305	1.162	23	0.323		33mm	First assault rifle round, used in MKb 42.
8mm Lebel	1886	France		R	8×50mmR	2640	2212	1.676	49	0.323		50mm	a.k.a. 8×50mmR French. Adapted from the 11mm Gras. The first smokeless powder cartridge for military use, started the small-bore smokeless revolution.
8mm Remington Magnum	1978	US	1	R	8.22×72.39mm	2900	3734	2.575	92.0	0.323	0.332	72.39mm	Belted.
8×53mmR Murata	1880	Japan		R	8×53mmR	1850	1810	1.957	47.4	0.329		53mm	11×60mm Murata case necked down to 8mm.
8×56mm MS	1908	Austria-Hungary	1	R	8×56mm	2297	2440	2.124		0.323		56mm	Mannlicher–Schönauer
8×57 I	1888	Germany	0	R	8.09×57.00mm	2700	2913			0.318		57.00mm	aka 8×57 J, 7.92×57mm Mauser, 8×57mm Mauser, 8mm Mauser. Original smaller-bore specification. Bullet diameter and chamber pressure were increased in 1905, becoming 8×57 IS. Vintage rifles in this older chambering will dangerously accept modern 8×57 IS.
8×57 IS	1905	Germany	8	R	8.22×57.00mm	3208	3171	1.977	57	0.323	0.450	57.00mm	a.k.a. 8×57 JS, 7.92×57mm Mauser, 8×57mm Mauser, 8mm Mauser. Dangerously-similar to the original, smaller-bore 1888 rimless 8×57 I a.k.a. 8×57 J. Also similar to the rimmed 8×57 IRS a.k.a. 8×57 JRS.
8×58mmR Danish Krag	1889	Denmark		R	8x58mm	2500	2720	2.176	54.5	0.322		58mm	aka 8×58mmR Danish Krag. Danish service rifle 1889-1945
8x60mm Mauser	1919	Germany	1	R	8×60mm	2625	2850	2.171		0.323		60mm	aka 8×60mm RWS. Civilian 8mm Mauser. Comes in J and S bullets, rimmed or rimless case. Still loaded by RWS, Prvi Partizan.
8×63mm patron m/32	1932	Sweden	1	R	8×63mm	2500	3025			0.323		63mm	a.k.a. 8x63mm Swedish mg. Used in Swedish machine guns from the 1930s onward.
8×64mm Brenneke	1912	Germany	0	R	8×64mm	2890	3420			0.323		64mm	Also 8x65mmR. Comes in J and S bullets. Based on 9.3x62mm and 9.3x74mmR.
8×68mm S	1939	Germany	2	R	8×68mm	3500	3958	2.262	81	0.323	0.450	68mm	aka 8×68Smm Magnum.
9mm Browning Long	1903	Belgium	1	H	9.09×20.20mm	1100	300	0.545	5.0	0.355		20.20mm	Developed for the FN Browning 1903 Model pistol
9mm Mars	1900	UK		H	9.14×26.32mm	1400	675	0.964		0.360		26.32mm	Bottle necked cartridge for the Webley-Mars Automatic Pistol.
9×18mm Makarov	1951	USSR	10	H	9×18mm	1017	212			0.365		18mm	a.k.a. 9mm Makarov.
9×19mm Parabellum	1901	Germany	6	H	9×19mm	1155	342	0.592	8.2	0.355	0.212	19mm	a.k.a. 9mm Parabellum, 9mm Para, or 9mm Luger.
9×39mm	1980s	USSR			9×39mm								
9×53mmR	1955	USSR		R	9×53mm	2100	2266			0.363		53mm	
9×56mm MS	1900	Austria-Hungary	0	R	9×56mm	2100	2400			0.356		56mm	Mannlicher–Schönauer
9×57mm Mauser	1890	Germany		R	9.06×56.8mm	2423	2692	2.222	46	0.356		56.8mm	Also available in a rimmed version.
9.3×57mm	1900	Sweden	1	R	9.3×57mm	2362	2875			0.365		57mm	Scandinavian 8×57mm variant currently offered by Norma
9.3×62mm	1905	Germany	6	R	9.3×62mm	2360	3537	2.997	67	0.366	0.494	62mm	Designed by Otto Bock for use in magazine rifles, e.g. Mauser 98, for African game.
9.3×64mm Brenneke	1910	Germany	1	R	9.3×64mm	2576	4317	3.352		0.366	0.465	64mm	
9.3×74mmR	1900	Germany	2	R	9.30×74.70mmR	2448	3721	3.04	96.5	0.366		74.70mm	German big-game cartridge.
9.5×57mm MS	1900	UK or Austria-Hungary	0	R	9.5×57mm	2150	2768			0.375		57mm	aka 9.5×56mm Mannlicher–Schönauer, 9.5×56.7mm and .375 Nitro Express Rimless.
10mm Auto	1983	Sweden	5	H	10.17×25.20mm	1551	680	0.877	11.2	0.400	0.164	25.20mm	
10.75×68mm Mauser	1920	Germany	0	R	10.75×68mm	2200	3740			0.424		68mm	Once popular with European hunters in Africa and India. Approaches .375 H&H power with top loads.
11mm Gras	1874	France		R	11×59mmR	1493	1903	2.549	78	0.445		59mm	The first French brass cartridge for military use. Black powder. Replaced by 8mm Lebel.
11×60mm Mauser	1871	Germany		R	11×60mmR	1430	2013	2.815	77	0.446		60mm	The first black powder cartridge adopted in large numbers by the unified German Army, it was used in the 1871 and 1871/84 rifles.
11×60mm Murata	1880	Japan		R	11×60mmR	1487	2063	2.775	77	0.432		60mm	The first black powder cartridge adopted in large numbers by the Japanese Army, it was used in the Murata rifle, a hybrid of French Gras and German Mausers 1871 and 1871/84 rifles.
12.7×108mm	1930	USSR		R	12.7×108mm	2700	11980 (13737)		255	0.511		108mm	Used in Heavy Machine Guns, AT-rifles and anti-materiel rifles.
14.5×114mm	1941	USSR		R	14.5×114mm	3300	24520	14.861	1026	0.586		114mm	Used in Heavy Machine Guns, AT-rifles and anti-materiel rifles.
.17 Hornet	1950s	US	2	R	4.37×35.31mmR	3629	705	0.389	13.2	0.172		35.31mm	Necked-down .22 Hornet. Watch out for differences between older .17 Ackley Hornet and newer .17 Hornady Hornet. No CIP or SAAMI specs found.
.17 HM2	2004	US	1	R	4.4×18.1mm	2100	166	0.158		0.172	0.125	18.1mm	Rimfire
.17 HMR	2002	US	4	R	4.5×26.9mm	2525	246	0.195	17	0.172	0.125	26.9mm	Rimfire.
.17 Remington	1971	US	2	R	4.4×45.6mm	4123	952	0.462	27	0.172	0.151	45.6mm	
.17 Remington Fireball	2007	US	1	R	4.4×36.1mm	4037	723	0.358	20.5	0.172		36.1mm	High-performance approx 4,000 ft/s (1,200 m/s) in a small case.
.17 WSM	2012	US	3	R	4.4×31mm	3000	400	0.267		0.172	0.230	31mm	Rimfire.
.204 Ruger	2004	US	6	R	5.2×47mm	4456	1351	0.614	31.5	0.204	0.275	47mm	Varmint round.
.218 Bee	1938	US	1	R	5.7×34.2mmR	3545	822	0.464	14.9	0.224		34.2mm	Rimmed.
.22 BR Remington	1963	US		R	5.69×38.15mm	3617	1590	0.879	32.8	0.224	0.415	38.15mm	Wildcat.
.22 Hornet	1930	US	6	R	5.7×35.6mmR	3070	732	0.477	13.0	0.224	0.415	35.6mm	First centerfire cartridge widely adapted for varmint hunting.
.22 Long Rifle	1887	US	6	R	5.7×15.6mmR	1750	137	0.233	5	0.223		15.6mm	Rimfire. Most common cartridge in the world (by units sold). Black powder propellant charge listed - smokeless likely lower.
.22 PPC	1974	US		R	5.7×38.5mm	3684	1427	0.775	32.0	0.224		38.5mm	
.22 Short	1857	US	3	H	5.6×11mmR	1164	87	0.149	4	0.222		11mm	Rimfire. Oldest commercial cartridge being loaded today. Black powder propellant charge listed - smokeless likely lower.
.22 WMR	1959	US	6	R	5.7×26.8mmR	2200	322	0.293		0.224	0.095	26.8mm	Rimfire.
.22-250 Remington	1965	US	7	R	5.7×48.6mm	4545	1776	0.798	43.0	0.224	0.264	48.6mm	Varminter.
.220 Swift	1935	US	5	R	5.7×56mm	4423	1727	0.897	46.0	0.224	0.264	56.0mm	
.221 Remington Fireball	1963	US	1	H	5.7×35.6mm	3791	780	0.412	22.0	0.224	0.415	35.6mm	Handgun round adapted from 222 Remington.
.222 Remington	1950	US	8	R	5.7×43.2mm	3760	1099	0.585	26.2	0.224	0.242	43.2mm	
.223 Remington	1955	US	8	R	5.56×45mm	4000	1243	0.622	29.5	0.224	0.395	45mm	Similar but not interchangeable with 5.56NATO.
.223 WSSM	2003	US	1	R	5.7×42.4mm	4568	1918	0.849	50.5	0.224	0.415	42.4mm	Winchester Super Short Magnum
.224 Boz	1997	UK		H	5.56×23mm	2500	694			0.223		23mm	10mm Auto case necked down to 5.56mm.
.224 Weatherby Magnum	1963	US		R	5.70×48.84mm	3865	1704	0.882	36.5	0.224	0.415	48.84mm	Smallest belted magnum case available commercially.
.225 Winchester	1964	US	1	R	5.7×49mmSR	3650	1621	0.888	37.0	0.224	0.415	49.00mm	Semi-rimmed.
.240 Apex	1920	UK	0	R	6.2×63mm	2900	1865			0.245		63mm	aka .240 H&H Magnum Rimless, .240 Magnum Flanged or .240 Super Express
.240 Weatherby Magnum	1968	US		R	6.18×63.50mm	3817	2633	1.38	59.0	0.243		63.50mm	Belted.
.242 Rimless Nitro Express	1923	UK	0	R	6×60mm	2800	1740			0.249-0.253		60mm	aka .242 Manton.
.243 Winchester	1955	US	8	R	6.2×51.9mm	3925	2140	1.09	51.0	0.243	0.405	51.9mm	.308 Winchester case necked down to 6mm.
.243 WSSM	2003	US	1	R	6.2×42.4mm	4068	2323	1.142	54.0	0.243	0.525	42.4mm	Winchester Super Short Magnum
.244 H&H Magnum	1955	UK	0	R	6.2x71mm	3500	2720			0.245		71mm	
.244 Halger Magnum	1920	Germany	0	R	6.5×57mm	3270	2142			.243		57mm	from Halger Arms Co. of Hamburg
.25 ACP	1906	US	6	H	6.4×15.6mmR	970	73	0.151	1.8	0.251	0.072	15.6mm	Handgun round, popular for small size and weight.
.25 WSSM	2004	US	1	R	6.5×42.4mm	3762	2581	1.372	52.0	0.257	0.418	42.4mm	Winchester Super Short Magnum
.25-06 Remington	1969	US	5	R	6.54×63.35mm	3350	2513	1.5	62.0	0.257	0.391	63.35mm	Necked-down 30-06.
.25-20 Winchester	1895	US	2	R	6.6×32.8mmR	2101	675	0.643	15	0.257	0.418	32.8mm	.32-20 Winchester case necked down.
.250-3000 Savage	1915	US	1	R	6.6×48.6mm	3341	2138	1.28	40.5	0.257	0.418	48.6mm	
.256 Winchester Magnum	1962	US	0	H	6.5×32.5mmR	2386	705	0.591	18.0	0.257		32.5mm	.357 Magnum case necked down to .257". a.k.a. 256 Winchester. Obsolete handgun and lever action round.
.257 Roberts	1934	US	4	R	6.55×56.72mm	2946	2255	1.531	54.0	0.257	0.391	56.72mm	
.257 Weatherby Magnum	1944	US	1	R	6.54×64.74mm	3550	2708	1.526	80.0	0.257	0.390	64.74mm	Belted.
.260 Remington	1998	US	2	R	6.72×51.69mm	3313	2043	1.233	51.0	0.264	0.719	51.69mm	
.26 Nosler	2013	US	5	R	6.5×65.8mm	3400	3171			0.264		65.8mm	
.264 Winchester Magnum	1958	US	3	R	6.73×63.50mm	3863	3020	1.564	78.0	0.264	0.561.	63.50mm	Belted.
.270 Weatherby Magnum	1943	US	1	R	7.04×64.74mm	3647	3639	1.996	81.0	0.277	0.625	64.74mm	Belted. First of Weatherby's line of necked-down 300 H&H-based magnums.
.270 Winchester	1925	US	8	R	7.06×64.52mm	3200	2968	1.855	64.0	0.277	0.495	64.52mm	Necked-down .30-06 Springfield.
.270 WSM	2002	US	5	R	7.06×53.34mm	3789	3485	1.84	73.0	0.277	0.625.	53.34mm	Winchester Short Magnum
.275 H&H Magnum	1912	UK	0	R	7.3×64mm	2700	2600			0.287		64mm	aka .275 Belted Magnum. Also comes in rimmed version called "Flanged". Necked down .375 H&H Magnum
.280 Jeffery	1913	UK	0	R	7.3×64mm	3000	2800			0.288		64mm	Necked down .333 Jeffery
.280 Ackley Improved	2007	US		R	7.23×64.14mm	3271	3084	1.886	66.0	0.284		64.14mm	Former wildcat now registered by Nosler with SAAMI.
.280 British	1946	UK		R	7.2×43mm	2549	2019		28.5	0.283		43mm	a.k.a. 7mm FN Short. Intermediate round adopted in 1951.
.280 Remington	1957	US	6	R	7.2×64.5mm	3433	2899	1.689	64.0	0.284	0.486	64.5mm	.30-06 Springfield case necked down to 7mm.
.280 Ross	1906	Canada	0	R	7.3×66mm	2900	2620			0.287		66mm	.280 Nitro, .280 Rimless Nitro Express Ross (CIP) and .280 Rimless. Once manufactured by Remington and Winchester.
.28 Nosler	2014	US	2	R	7×65.8mm	3300	3883			0.284		65.78mm	
.30 Carbine	1940	US	6	R	7.62×33mm	2000	977	0.977	16.0	0.308		33mm	M1 Carbine US service rifle
.30 Herrett	1973	US		H	7.8mm	2270	1470	1.295	27.0	0.308			Wildcat handgun cartridge, based on a shortened .30-30 Winchester.
.30 Nosler	2016	US	2	R	7.62×64.9mm	3200	4092			0.308		64.9mm	
.30 Remington AR	2008	US	1	R	7.849×38.86mm	3076	2208	1.436	40.0	0.308		38.86mm	Billed as "The worlds only 30-caliber big-game cartridge for the light weight AR-15 platform."
.30-06 Springfield	1906	US	8	R	7.62×63mm	3080	3178	2.064	62.5	0.308	0.480	63mm	Developed for the U.S. Army's M1903 Springfield rifles prior to WWI. Continued use in the M1 Garand rifle throughout WWII.
.30-30 Winchester	1895	US	6	R	7.8×51.8mmR	2500	2046	1.637	39	0.308	0.330	51.8mm	a.k.a. .30 Winchester Centerfire and .30 WCF. First smokeless cartridge designed for big game hunting.
.30-40 Krag	1892	US	2	R	7.8×58.8mmR	2898	2766	1.909	51	0.308	0.730	58.8mm	Rimmed cartridge.
.30-378 Weatherby Magnum	1959	US		R	7.83×73.99mm	3690	4956	2.686	123.5	0.308	0.730	73.99mm	Belted. Necked-down 378 Weatherby Magnum, developed for 1000-yard performance. Was military-only from 1959 to 1996.
.300 AAC Blackout	2011	US	2	R	7.62×35mm	2388	1487	2.05	20.0	0.308		35mm	Developed for suppressed CQB as a sub sonic round. Supersonic is also available.
.300 H&H Magnum	1925	UK	2	R	7.82×72.39mm	3394	3485	2.054	81.0	0.308	0.730	72.39mm	Belted. a.k.a. 300 H&H Super a.k.a. Holland's Super 30.
.300 Remington Short Action Ultra Magnum	2002	US	1	R	7.85×51.18mm	3663	3761	2.054	69.0	0.308	0.730	51.18mm	Beltless, rebated rim. Remington Short Action Ultra Magnum.
.300 Remington Ultra Magnum	1998	US	2	R	7.85×72.39mm	3638	4414	2.427	107.0	0.308	0.730.	72.39mm	Beltless, rebated rim. Fastest cartridge for Nosler's 210-grain AccuBond Long-Range G1=0.730 0.308" bullet.
.300 Ruger Compact Magnum	2007	US	1	R	7.62×53mm	3310	3716	2.245	67.5	0.308	0.480	53mm	Based on .375 Ruger case.
.300 Savage	1920	US	4	R	7.8×47.5mm	2740	2500	1.825	45.2	0.308	0.370	47.5mm	
.300 Weatherby Magnum	1944	US	3	R	7.8×71.8mm	3375	3890	2.305	90.0	0.308	0.447	71.8mm	
.300 Whisper	2009	US	1	R	7.84×34.90mm	1020	480	0.941	12.0	0.308	0.648	34.90mm	Designed for quiet, accurate, subsonic applications. Year is for homologation by CIP - earlier proprietary and wildcat versions existed.
.300 Winchester Magnum	1963	US	8	R	7.8×67mm	3709	3893	2.29	88.0	0.308	0.730	67mm	
.300 WSM	2001	US	5	R	7.8×53.5mm	3697	3872	2.095	74.5	0.308	0.730	53.5mm	Winchester Short Magnum
.300 Norma Magnum	2012	US	1	R	7.62×63.3mm	3003	4404			0.308		63.3mm	Necked-down .338 Norma Mag. Selected by US Special Forces in 2016.
.303 British	1889	UK	7	R	7.7×56mmR	2685	2401	1.788	54	0.311	0.361	56mm	Former British Service rifle Lee–Enfield.
.307 Winchester	1982	US	1	R	7.8×51mmR	3000	2083	1.389	53.0	0.308		51mm	Rimmed version of the .308 Winchester, for use in lever-action rifles.
.308 Marlin Express	2006	US	1	R	7.62×48mm	2800	2514	1.796	47.7	0.308	0.395	48mm	Based upon a slightly shortened .308 Winchester cases with FTX bullets and special powder to approach .308 ballistics from a Marlin lever-action rifle.
.308 Norma Magnum	1960	Sweden	1	R	7.85×65.00mm	3687	3640	1.975	84.0	0.308		65.00mm	Belted. European cartridge designed for the US market.
.308 Winchester	1955	US	8	R	7.62×51mm	3358	3009	1.792	54.50	0.308	0.530	51mm	Civilian 7.62mm NATO.
.318 Westley Richards	1910	UK	0	R	8.4×60.1mm	2400	3194			.330		60.1mm	Proprietary cartridge
.32 ACP	1899	Belgium	6	H	7.65×17mm	937	129	0.275	3	0.312	0.090	17mm	.32 Automatic Colt Pistol. a.k.a. .7.65mm Browning.
.32 H&R Magnum	1984	US	2	H	7.9×27.3mmR	1150	235	0.409	12.0	0.314		27.3mm	Lengthened .32 S&W Long.
.32 NAA	2002	US	1	H	7.95×17.3mm	1000	178	0.356	5.4	0.311		17.3mm	North American Arms
.32 rimfire	1861	US		H	8×14.6mm	945	159			0.316		14.6mm	a.k.a. .32 Short and .32 Long. Introduced in Smith & Wesson's Model 2 revolver.
.32 S&W	1878	US	2	H	7.9×15mmR	595	115	0.387	1.4	0.314		15mm	
.32 S&W Long	1896	US	5	H	7.9×23.4mmR	865	132	0.305	3	0.314		23.4mm	Lengthened .32 S&W case.
.32 Winchester Self-Loading	1905	US	0	R	8.2×31mmR	1440	775	1.076	12.5	0.320		31mm	a.k.a. .32 WSL or .32 SL. Obsolete. Only chambered commercially in the Winchester Model 1905 rifle.
.32 Winchester Special	1895	US	4	R	8.18×51.82mmR	2359	1748	1.482	38.5	0.321		51.82mm	Lever action, rimmed. Developed for the Winchester Model 1894.
.32-20 Winchester	1882	US	2	R	7.94×33.4mmR	1031	1151	2.233	7.5	0.312		33.4mm	
.325 WSM	2005	US	1	R	8.2×53.3mm	3360	3762	2.239	75.0	0.323		53.3mm	Winchester Short Magnum
.327 Federal Magnum	2008	US	1	H	7.9×30mmR	1600	370	0.463	14.0	0.312		30mm	
.33 Nosler	2016	US	3	R	8.6×62.5mm	3025	4589			0.338		64.9mm	
.333 Jeffery	1908	UK	0	R	8.5×62.9mm	2500	3230			0.333		62.9mm	Necked down .404 Jeffery
.338 Federal	2007	US	1	R	8.61×51.18mm	2937	3061	2.084	52.0	0.338	0.41	51.18mm	Necked up .308 Win.
.338-06	1998	US		R	8.6×63mm	2678	3582		62.5	0.338		63mm	Necked up .30-06.
.338 Lapua Magnum	1983	Finland	5	R	8.6×70mm	2900	4768	3.288	106.0	0.338	0.700	70mm	Designed for military sniper rifles.
.338 Norma Magnum	2008	US	1	R	8.6×63.3mm					0.338		63.3mm	Wildcat designed to derive maximum effect from long, aerodynamic bullets.
.338 Marlin Express	2010	US	1	R	8.60×48.01mmR	2565	2922	2.278	49.3	0.338	0.430	48.01mm	Rimmed lever action cartridge designed for the Marlin Model 336.
.338 Remington Ultra Magnum	2000	US	2	R	8.60×70.1mm	3332	4492	2.696	104.0	0.338		70.1mm	Beltless, rebated rim cartridge based on the .300 Remington Ultra Magnum.
.338 Ruger Compact Magnum	2007	US	1	R	8.6×51.2mm	2980	3865	2.594	63.0	0.338	0.515	51.2mm	Based on .375 Ruger case.
.338 Winchester Magnum	1958	US	5	R	8.61×63.50mmR	3080	4077	2.647	78.0	0.338	0.515	63.50mm	Belted.
.348 Winchester	1936	US	1	R	8.8×57.3mmR	2630	2685	2.042	70.0	0.348		57.3mm	One of the most powerful rimmed cartridges ever used in a lever rifle.
.35 Remington	1906	US	4	R	9.1×49mm	2302	1958	1.701	45.0	0.358	0.300	49mm	Lever action.
.35 Whelen	1922	US	4	R	9.1×63mm	2891	3363	2.327	65.0	0.358	0.282	63mm	Necked up .30-06.
.35 Winchester Self-Loading	1905	US	0	R	8.9×29.3mmR	1452	848	1.168	13.5	0.351		29.3mm	a.k.a. .35 WSL or .35 SL. Obsolete. Only chambered commercially in the Winchester Model 1905 rifle.
.350 Legend	2019	US		R	9×43mm	2300	1800		36.5	0.355		43mm	Straight-walled hunting cartridge
.350 Remington Magnum	1965	US	1	R	9.12×55.12mm	2775	3419	2.464	64.5	0.358	0.293	55.12mm	Belted.
.351 Winchester Self-Loading	1906	US		R	8.9×34.9mmR	1850	981	1.061	19.5	0.351		34.9mm	a.k.a. .351 WSL or .351 SL. Only chambered commercially in the Winchester Model 1907 rifle.
.357 Magnum	1935	US	6	H	9.1×33mmR	1500	624	0.832	23.0	0.357	0.206	33mm	Lengthened .38 Special.
.357 SIG	1994	Germany/US	6	H	9.02×21.97mm	1350	502	0.744	10.8	0.355	0.212	21.97mm	
.358 Winchester	1955	US	2	R	9.11×51.18mm	2475	2720	2.198	52.0	0.358	0.282	51.18mm	
.360 Buckhammer	2023	US	4	R	9.12×62.50mm	2399	2300	1.917		0.359		45.72mm	Introduced by Remington at the 2023 SHOT Show. Straight-walled cartridge based on a blown-out .30-30 Winchester case and designed for deer hunting in U.S. states that require hunters with modern rifles to use that cartridge shape.
.376 Steyr	1999	Austria & US	2	R	9.5×60mm	2754	4211			0.375		60mm	Hornady and Steyr announced this cartridges at the 2000 Shot Show, based on a concept by Jeff Cooper.
.375 Holland & Holland Magnum	1912	UK	7	R	9.5×72.4mm	2800	4700	3.357	87	0.375	0.430	72.4mm	The rimmed .375 H&H Flanged Magnum for double-guns and the .375 H&H Belted Rimless Magnum with a headspacing belt for magazine-fed rifles were released simultaneously in 1912.
.375 Ruger	2007	US	1	R	9.5×65.5mm	2840	4835	3.405	90.5	0.375	0.430	65.5mm	Developed in collaboration between Ruger and Hornady.
.375 Remington Ultra Magnum	2002	US	1	R	9.5×72.4mm	3293	5421	3.292	105.0	0.375		72.4mm	A beltless, rebated rim cartridge developed by Remington Arms by necking up the .300 Remington Ultra Magnum case.
.375 Weatherby Magnum	1945	US		R	9.5×72.6mm	3110	5223	3.359	99.0	0.375		72.6mm	Belted magnum based on the .375 H&H, blown out and reshouldered.
.38 Long Colt	1877	US	0	H	9.2×26.2mmR	777	195	0.502	3.7	0.358		26.2mm	a.k.a. .38 LC. Obsolete.
.38 S&W	1877	US	3	H	9.2×19.7mmR	675	176	0.521	2.6	0.358		19.7mm	4th or 5th oldest commercial cartridge being loaded today.
.38 Special	1902	US	6	H	9.1×29.3mmR	1090	290	0.532	6.8	0.357	0.206	29.3mm	
.38 Super	1929	US	4	H	9.04×22.86mmR	1300	500	0.769	5.4	0.356		22.86mm	a.k.a. .38 Super and .38 Colt Auto.
.38-40 Winchester	1874	US	1	R	10.17×33.15mmR	1160	538	0.928	19.5	0.401	0.172	33.15mm	aka 38-40 WCF. Crossover rifle/handgun cartridge.
.38-55 Winchester	1884	US	1	R	9.59×53.0mmR	1853	1165	1.257	35.0	0.379		53.00mm	
.380 ACP	1912	US	6	H	9×17mm	1000	200	0.4	4.3	0.355		17mm	a.k.a. .380 Auto, 9mm Browning Short
.40 S&W	1990	US	6	H	10.2×21.6mm	1180	479	0.812	11.5	0.400	0.164	21.6mm	
.400 Corbon	1997	US		H	10.2×23mm	1400	588			0.401		23mm	.45 ACP case necked down to .40 caliber.
.400 H&H Magnum	2003	UK		R	10.4×72.3mm	2375	5015			0.411		72.3mm	Belted magnum.
.401 Winchester Self-Loading	1910	US	0	R	10.31×38mmR	2135	1958	1.834	29.0	0.406		38mm	Rimmed. a.k.a. .401 WSL or .401 SL. Obsolete. Only chambered commercially in the Winchester Model 1910 and the Belgian Clement-Neumann rifle.
.404 Jeffery	1909	UK	3	R	10.72×73.02mm	2600	4700	3.615	96.4	0.423	0.358	73.02mm	aka 404 Rimless Nitro Express.
.405 Winchester	1904	US	0	R	10.45×65.61mmR	2404	3311	2.936	61.0	0.411		65.61mm	Most powerful rimmed cartridge designed specifically for lever-action rifles. Obsolete.
.408 Cheyenne Tactical	2001	US		R	10.4×77mm	3500	7744			0.408	0.874	77mm	Used in Cheyenne Tactical's M200 Intervention, and M310 rifles.
.41 Action Express	1986	US		H	10.4×22mm	1114	457	0.82	8.4	0.410		22.0mm	
.41 Long Colt	1877	US	0	H	10.35×28.9mmR	730	235	0.644	3.4	0.410		28.9mm	Obsolete
.41 Remington Magnum	1964	US	3	H	10.4×32.8mmR	1887	788	0.835	26.5	0.410		32.8mm	
.416 Barrett	2006	US		R	10.6×83mm	3150	8764	5.564	200	0.416	0.72	83mm	Designed as an alternative to the .50 BMG for sniper rifles.
.416 Remington Magnum	1988	US	5	R	10.6×72.4mm	2400	5116	4.263	90.0	0.416	0.367	72.4mm	
.416 Rigby	1911	UK	4	R	10.6×74mm	2415	5180	4.29	116.0	0.416	0.319	74mm	Later used parent cartridge of the .338 Lapua Magnum.
.42 Berdan	1868	Russia		R	10.75×58mmR	1450	1724	2.378	77	0.430		58mm	Black powder Russian service rifle. a.k.a. 4.2 Line Berdan. Designed by American inventor/soldier Hiram Berdan, adopted by Russia in trapdoor 1868 and turnbolt 1870 Berdan Rifles.
.44 AMP	1971	US		H	10.9×33mm	1485	1600	2.155	27.0	0.429		33mm	a.k.a. .44 Auto Mag Pistol.
.44 Henry	1860	US	0	R	11×23mmR	1125	568	1.01	28	0.423		23mm	a.k.a. .44 Rimfire, .44 Long Rimfire, or 11×23mmR. Obsolete black powder cartridge.
.44 Magnum	1955	US	6	H	10.9×32.6mmR	1550	999	1.289	31.5	0.430	0.245	32.6mm	a.k.a. .44 Remington Magnum. Lengthened .44 Special. Crossover rifle/handgun cartridge.
.44 Russian	1870	US		H	11×25mmR	770	324	0.842		0.429		25mm	Also known as .44 S&W Russian. Black powder/smokeless handgun cartridge developed from .44 S&W American; developed into .44 Special.
.44 S&W American	1869	US	0	H	11×23mmR	765	259	0.677	5.5	0.434		23mm	Obsolete black powder/smokeless handgun cartridge.
.44 Special	1907	US	4	H	10.9×29mmR	1000	400	0.8	15.0	0.430	0.138	29mm	
.44-40 Winchester	1873	US	2	H	10.8×33.3mmR	1117	656	1.175	7.3	0.428	0.123	33.3mm	First developed for lever-action, later used in revolver.
.444 Marlin	1964	US	2	R	10.9×57.2mmR	2400	3389	2.824	56.0	0.429	0.225	57.2mm	Lengthened .44 Magnum case, but a lever-action rifle cartridge.
.45 ACP	1905	US	6	H	11.43×23mm	850	369	0.868	10	0.451	0.188	23mm	Automatic Colt Pistol, first self-loading U.S. Army pistol round.
.45 Colt	1873	US	4	H	11.58×32mm	960	460	0.958	13	0.452	0.140	32mm	a.k.a. .45 Long Colt or .45 LC. Used in both handgun and rifle.
.45 GAP	2003	Austria	3	H	11.5×19.2mm	1152	543		9.0	0.451		19.2mm	Glock Automatic Pistol.
.45 Winchester Magnum	1979	US	1	H	11.5×30.4mm	1472	1406	1.91	18.0	0.451		30.4mm	a.k.a. .45 Winchester Magnum. Lengthened and strengthened .45 ACP.
.45 Raptor	2014	US	2	R	11.5×58mm	3000	3197		48.5	0.452	0.151	58mm	Hybrid of the .460 S&W Magnum and the .308 Winchester. Designed to provide a .45 caliber capability to the AR-10 platform.
.45-70	1873	US	5	R	11.6×53.5mmR	2394	2518	2.104	63	0.458	0.230	53.5mm	a.k.a. .45-70 Government. One of the oldest centerfire cartridges still in commercial production.
.450 Adams	1868	UK	0	H	11.6×18mmR	700	245	0.7	13	0.455		18mm	a.k.a. .450 Boxer and .450 Revolver. Obsolete black powder handgun cartridge.
.450 Bushmaster	2007	US		R	11.5×43.2mm	2180	2744	2.517		0.452		43.2mm	Developed by hornady as a straight walled rifle round similar to .460 S&W Magnum
.450 Marlin	2000	US	1	R	11.6×53mmR	2225	3572	3.211	59.0	0.458	0.230	53mm	Lever action round. Shortened .458 Winchester Magnum case, designed to match .45-70 performance.
.450 Nitro Express	1895	UK	1	R	12.1×83mmR	2150	4927	4.583	157	0.458	0.325	83mm	J. Rigby smokeless cartridge based upon .450 Black Powder Express.
.454 Casull	1959	US	4	H	11.5×35.1mmR	1900	1924	2.025	38.2	0.452	0.180	35.1mm	Lengthened .45 Colt, most powerful handgun round until the 1990s.
.455 Webley	1897	UK		H	11.5×19.6mmR	700	285	0.814	5.0	0.455		19.6mm	Originally a black powder handgun cartridge.
.458 Lott	1971	US	3	R	11.66×71.12mm	2300	5873	5.107	79.0	0.458	0.389	71.12mm	Belted.
.458 U.S. Silent Sniper	1969	US	4	R	11.66×33mm	2140	5084	4.751	81.0	0.458	0.295	55mm	Developed for the Silent Sniper System
.458 Winchester Magnum	1956	US	4	R	11.66×64mm	2140	5084	4.751	81.0	0.458	0.295	64mm	
.46 rimfire	1870	US		H	11.6×21.2mmR				20	0.456		21.2mm	a.k.a. .46 Short, .46 Remington Carbine. First large-caliber metallic handgun cartridge. Black powder.
.460 S&W Magnum	2005	US	3	H	11.5×46mmR	2200	2149	1.954	48.5	0.452	0.151	46mm	Revolver cartridge for handgun hunting.
.460 Weatherby	1958	US		R	11.6×74mm	2808	7504	5.345	128.0	0.458		74mm	aka 460 Weatherby Magnum
.465 H&H Magnum	2003	UK		R	11.9×73.5mm	2375	6121		134	0.468		73.5mm	Belted magnum.
.470 Nitro Express	1907	UK	3	R	12.1×83mmR	1885	5132	5.445	125	0.475	0.290	83mm	Designed by Joseph Lang.
.475 Linebaugh	1988	US		H	12.1×36mmR	1400	1741	2.487		0.475		36mm	
.476 Enfield	1881	UK		H	11.6m×22mR				5.5	0.472		22mm	a.k.a. .476 Eley. Black powder/smokeless handgun cartridge.
.480 Ruger	2001	US	2	H	12.1×32.6mmR	1539	1315	1.709	26.5	0.475	0.150	32.6mm	Shortened .475 Linebaugh case.
.50 Action Express	1988	US	2	H	12.7×32.6mm	1475	1449	1.965	32.5	0.500	0.120	32.6mm	For IMI Desert Eagle handgun.
.50 Alaskan	1950s	US		R	13×53mmR	1694	3346	3.95		0.510		53mm	
.50 Beowulf	2001	US		R	12.7×42mm	1800	2878	3.198		0.500		42mm	
.50 BMG	1921	US	2	R	12.7×99mm	2815	13196	9.375	265	0.510	1.050	99mm	Used in Heavy Machine Guns and anti-materiel rifles.
.50 GI	2004	US		H	12.7x22.8mm	1200	591	0.985		0.500		22.8mm	Designed to have significantly less recoil than other 50 caliber handguns
.50 Remington Navy	1867	US	0	H	13×21.8mm	750	330	0.88	7.0	0.508		21.8mm	a.k.a. 50 Remington Pistol Navy Model 1867 and 50 Remington (M71 Army). Rimmed case 0.875" in length. Obsolete black powder/smokeless handgun cartridge.
.50-90 Sharps	1872	US		R	13×64mmR	1652	2210	2.676	37.0	0.509		64mm	The mainstay of the American bison (buffalo) hunter. Black powder/smokeless.
.500 Auto Max	2003	US	3	H	12.7×57.2mm	1950	2533	2.598	45.3	0.500	0.185	57.2mm	Rimmless variant of .500
.500 Linebaugh	1986	US		H	13×35.7mmR	1300	1632	2.511		0.510		35.7mm	
.500 S&W Magnum	2003	US	3	H	12.7×57.2mmR	1950	2533	2.598	45.3	0.500	0.185	57.2mm	One of the most powerful handgun-specific cartridges.
.505 Gibbs	1910	UK		R	12.8×80mm	2300	6180	5.374		0.505		80mm	
.577 Snider	1867	UK		R	14.5×51mmR	1380	1689	2.448	30	0.570		51mm	The first black powder cartridge for British military use. Later loaded smokeless.
.577/450 Martini–Henry	1871	UK		R	11.43×61mmR	1600	1870	2.338	38	0.455		61mm	Rimmed. The second black powder (later smokeless) cartridge for British military use. Evolved from the .577 Snider case, lengthened and necked down to .45 (nominal) caliber. Used in the Martini rifles from 1871 to the present.
.600 Nitro Express	1899	UK		R	15.7×76mmR	2050	7614	7.428	120	0.622		76mm	Rimmed. Jeffrey, 900-grain (58 g) bullet.
.700 Nitro Express	1988	UK		R	17.8×89mmR	2000	10566	10.566		0.700		89mm	Big game cartridge.
.950 JDJ	2014	US	1	R	24.1x70mm	2200	38685	35.168	3600	0.950		70mm	Largest centerfire rifle cartridge as of 2018

== See also ==
- Firearm
- History of the firearm
- Physics of firearms
- Terminal ballistics
- External ballistics
- Internal ballistics
- List of rifle cartridges
- List of rebated rim cartridges
- List of shotgun cartridges
- List of handgun cartridges
- Stopping power
- Hydrostatic shock
- Point-blank range
