= .401 Winchester Self-Loading =

Rifle cartridge

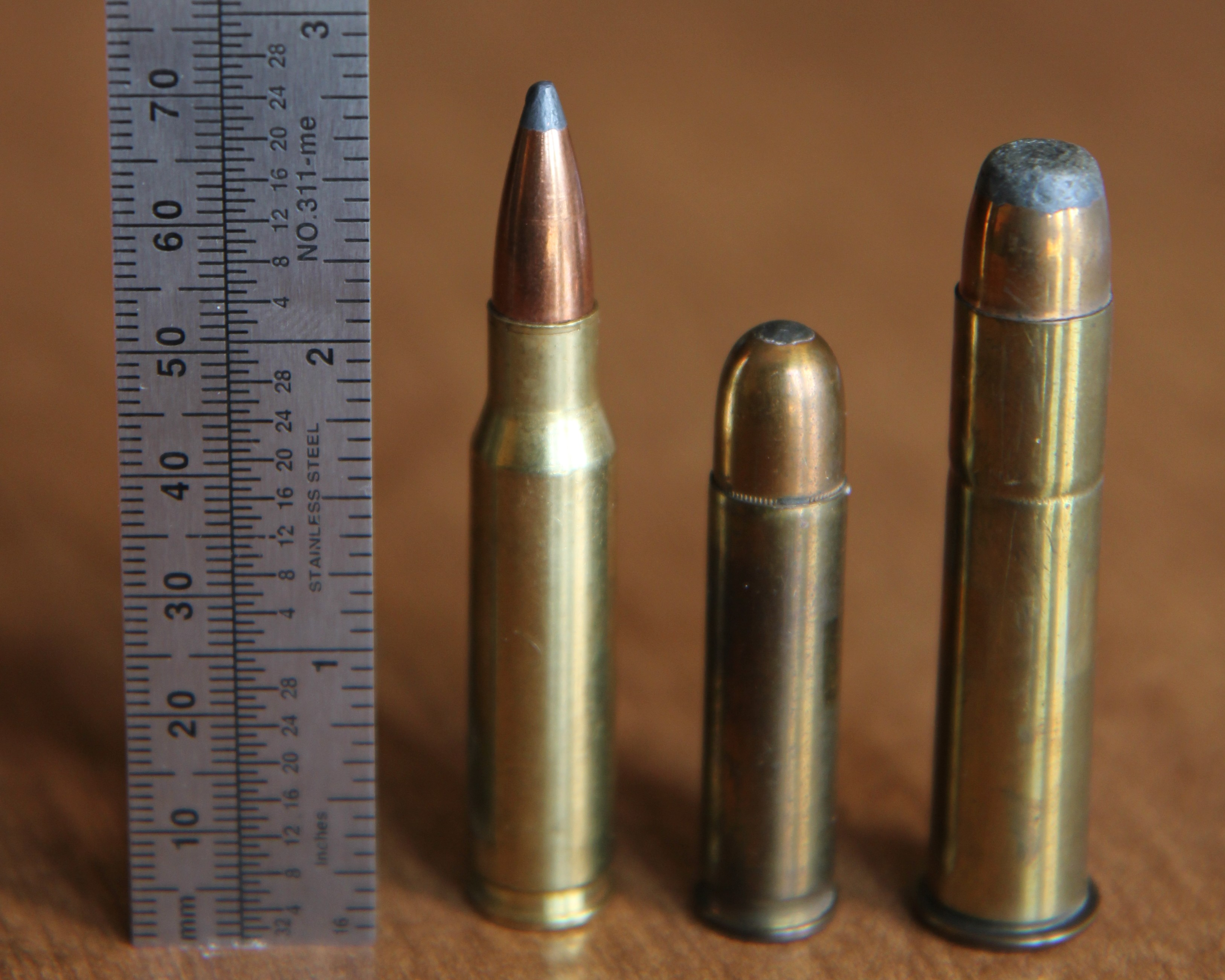
- .401 Winchester Self-Loading (Center) with .308 Win (left) and .45-70 (right).
- Type: Rifle
- Place of origin: USA

Production history
- Designer: Winchester Repeating Arms Company

Specifications
- Case type: Semi-rimmed, straight
- Bullet diameter: .4065 in (10.33 mm)
- Land diameter: .4000 in (10.16 mm)
- Neck diameter: .428 in (10.9 mm)
- Base diameter: .429 in (10.9 mm)
- Rim diameter: .457 in (11.6 mm)
- Rim thickness: 0.05 in (1.3 mm)
- Case length: 1.50 in (38 mm)
- Overall length: 2.005 in (50.9 mm)
- Rifling twist: 1 in 14 in (360 mm)
- Primer type: Large rifle
- Maximum pressure: 37,000–39,000 psi (260–270 MPa)

Ballistic performance
| Bullet mass/type | Velocity | Energy |
|---|---|---|
| 200 gr (13 g) | 2,141 ft/s (653 m/s) | 2,037 ft⋅lbf (2,762 J) |
| 250 gr (16 g) | 1,875 ft/s (572 m/s) | 1,952 ft⋅lbf (2,647 J) |
- Test barrel length: 20 inches (510 mm); Sources: Whelen, Townsend. The American Rifle. Century Co. 1918 p. 266

The .401 Winchester Self-Loading (.401SL / .401WSL) or 10.33x38mmSR is an American rifle cartridge.

== Description and performance ==
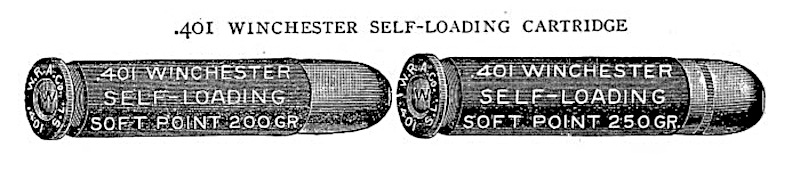
Illustration of a .401 Winchester Self-Loading rifle cartridge (1918).

Winchester introduced the .401SL in the Winchester '10 self-loading rifle as a supplement to the Winchester '07 and the .351SL in their offering of hi-power, self-loading rifles. The only chambering available in the Winchester Model 1910, the .401SL was used by France, Russia, and American company security forces in the First World War.

The .401SL proved powerful enough for both deer and other large game at ranges under 150 yards. Both 200gr and 250gr bullet weights were offered by Winchester and other ammunition manufacturers as factory loadings. With extra available detachable magazines holding 4-rounds each, the Model 1910 could provide substantial firepower for the big-game hunter. This feature helped promote the use of the .401SL on dangerous game such as moose and grizzly bear in spite of the lack of controlled expansion bullet designs, which doubtlessly would have improved game-taking performance and the subsequent reputation of the .401SL cartridge.

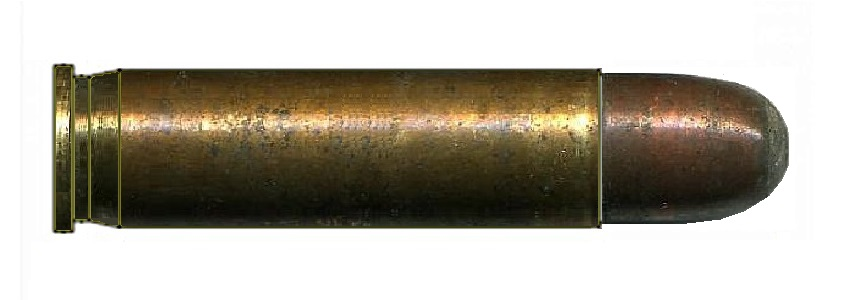
The .401 Winchester Self-Loading cartridge.

The .401 SL is of similar size to the later .41 Remington Magnum; but the longer self-loading rifle cartridge produced a muzzle energy of 2,000 foot-pounds force (2,700 J) with a 200-grain (13 g) bullet, while the magnum revolver is credited with a muzzle energy of 790 foot-pounds force (1,070 J) with a 210-grain (14 g) bullet. The .41 Remington Magnum revolver comparison is not entirely fitting, however, as a cartridge will often produce twice the muzzle energy when fired from a carbine as it does from a typically much shorter revolver barrel.

== Dimensions ==
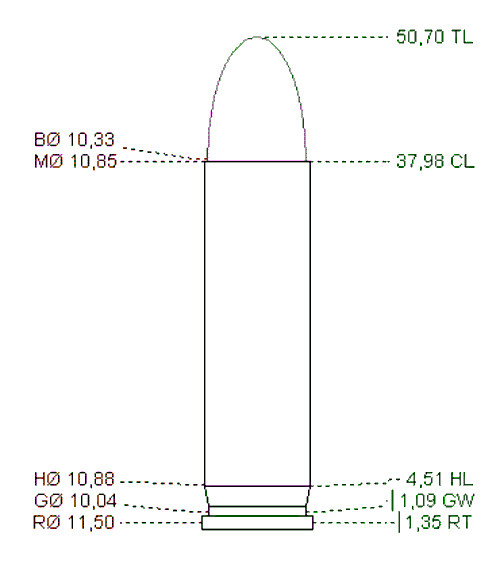

== See also ==
- List of Winchester Center Fire cartridges
- Table of handgun and rifle cartridges
- List of cartridges by caliber
- List of rifle cartridges
- 10 mm caliber
- .40 S&W
- 10mm Auto
- .41 Action Express
- .41 Remington Magnum
- .400 Legend
