= .32 Winchester Self-Loading =

Rifle cartridge

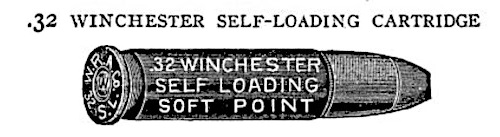
- Type: Rifle
- Place of origin: United States

Production history
- Designer: Winchester Repeating Arms Company

Specifications
- Case type: Semi-rimmed, straight
- Bullet diameter: .321 in (8.2 mm)
- Neck diameter: .347 in (8.8 mm)
- Base diameter: .349 in (8.9 mm)
- Rim diameter: .390 in (9.9 mm)
- Rim thickness: 0.05 in (1.3 mm)
- Case length: 1.24 in (31 mm)
- Overall length: 1.88 in (48 mm)
- Primer type: Small rifle
- Maximum pressure: 28,000 to 30,000 PSI

Ballistic performance
Bullet mass/type	Velocity	Energy
165 gr (11 g)	1,392 ft/s (424 m/s)	710 ft⋅lbf (960 J)
- Test barrel length: 22; Source(s): Whelen, Townsend. The American Rifle. Century Co. 1918 p. 257

The .32 Winchester Self-Loading (.32SL / .32SLR / .32WSL) or 8.2x31mmSR is an American rifle cartridge.

== Description ==
Winchester introduced the .32SL and .35SL cartridges in the Winchester Model 1905 self-loading rifle, a centerfire version of the Winchester Model 1903. The .32SL never gained popularity as a hunting cartridge, although it may be suitable for the largest small game such as fox and coyote at ranges under 150 yards. Both the .32SL and .35SL were soon superseded by the introduction of the more powerful .351SL in the Winchester Model 1907.

When first introduced, however, the notable firearm expert Townsend Whelen noted the .32SL cartridge as displaying similar ballistics as the .32-40 Winchester black powder, low-pressure cartridge. He further suggests the best use of the .32 SL as being for rapid-fire target shooting for ranges up to 300 yards. Within such ranges, it is quite an accurate cartridge.

In October 1940, an Army Ordnance circular suggested development of a light rifle using a .30 caliber cartridge similar to the "Winchester Self-loading Cartridge, Caliber .32" to replace the pistol and submachine gun. This led to the production of the "Caliber .30 SL, M1" cartridge directly based on the .32 SL in February 1941 and, after a design competition, adoption of the Winchester-designed M1 carbine in October 1941.

== Dimensions ==
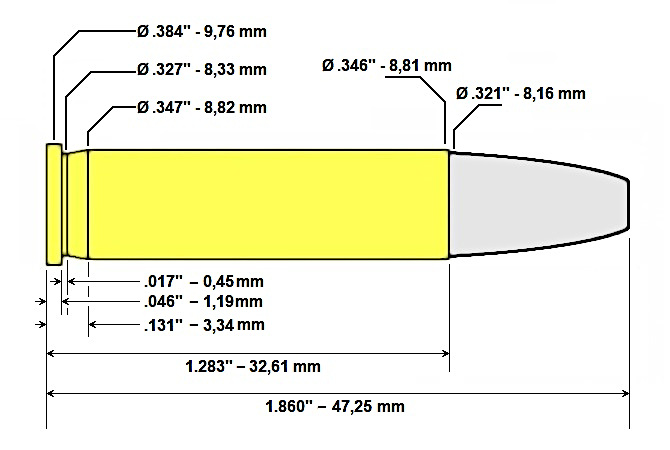

== See also ==
- 8 mm caliber
- List of cartridges by caliber
- List of rifle cartridges
- Table of handgun and rifle cartridges
