= SL7 =

SL7 may refer to:

- Heckler & Koch SL7, a type of rifle
- China Railways SL7, a type of steam locomotive
- London Buses route SL7
- SL7, a postcode district in the SL postcode area in the United Kingdom
