= Semi-automatic rifle =

Type of autoloading rifle

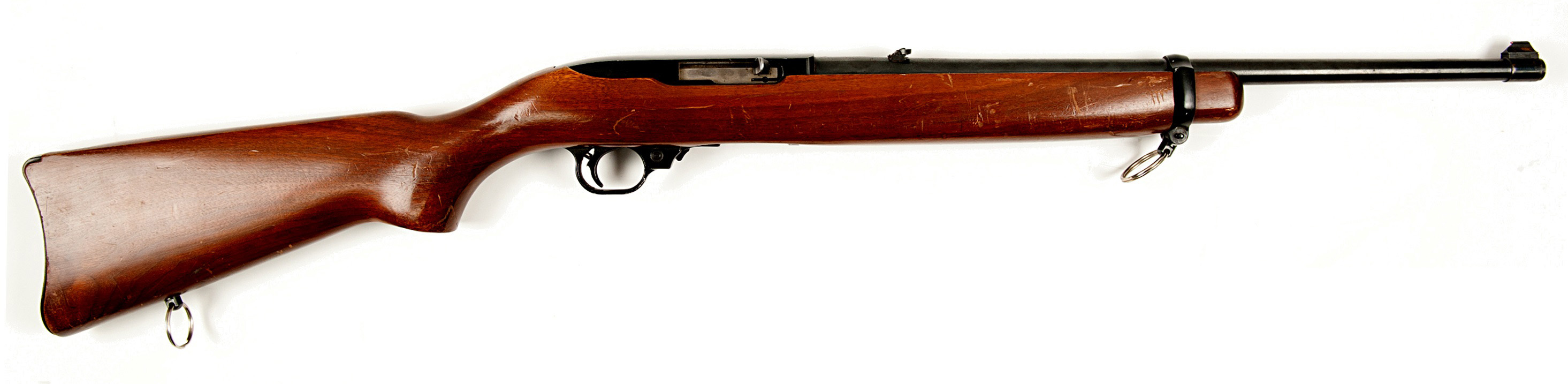
Ruger 10/22 - .22 Long Rifle

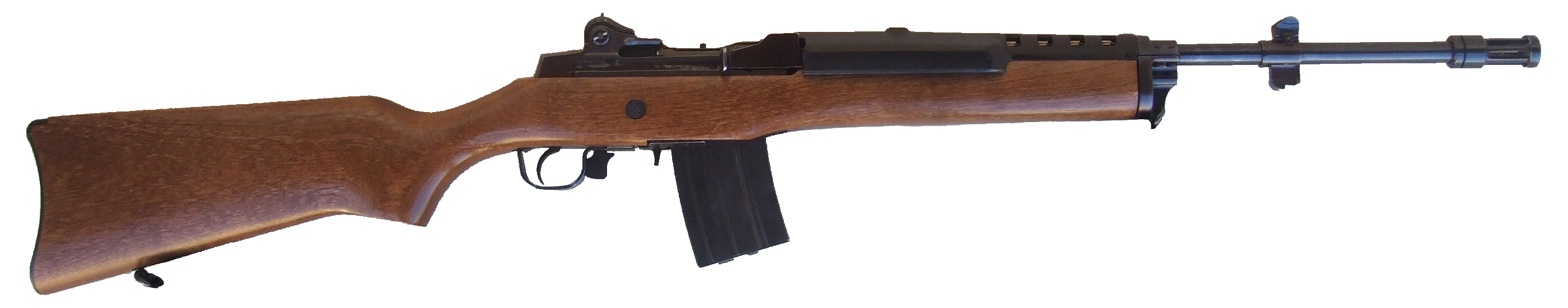
Ruger Mini-14 223 Remington or 5.56x45mm NATO

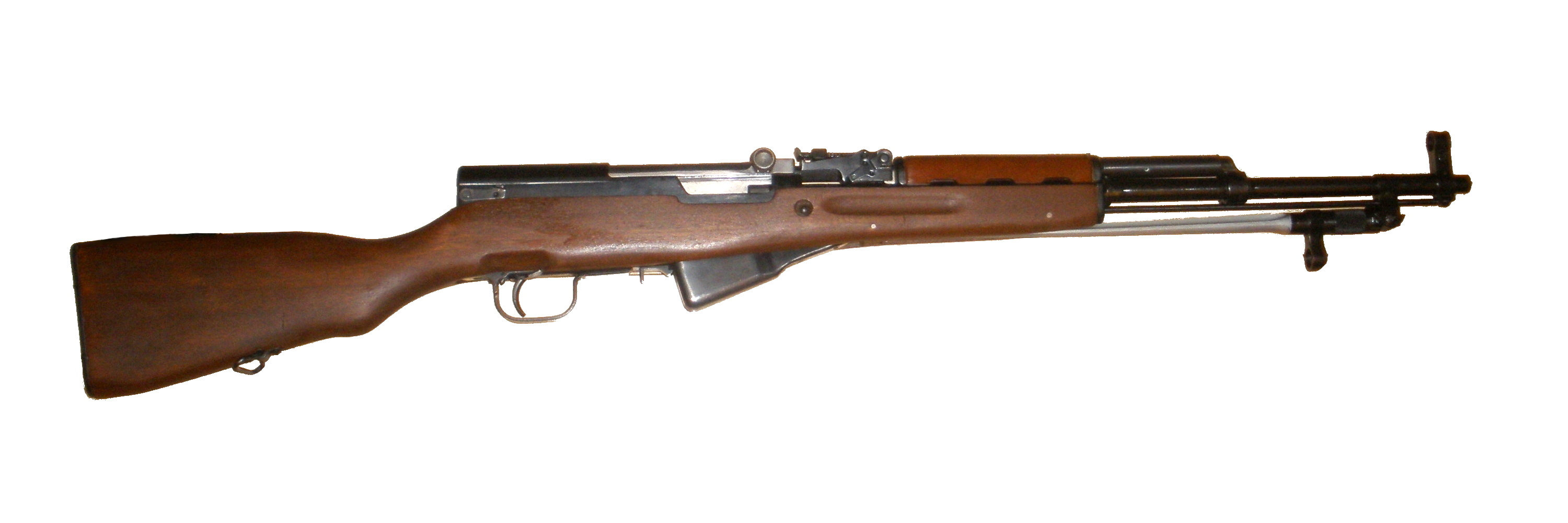
SKS Type 56 - 7.62×39mm

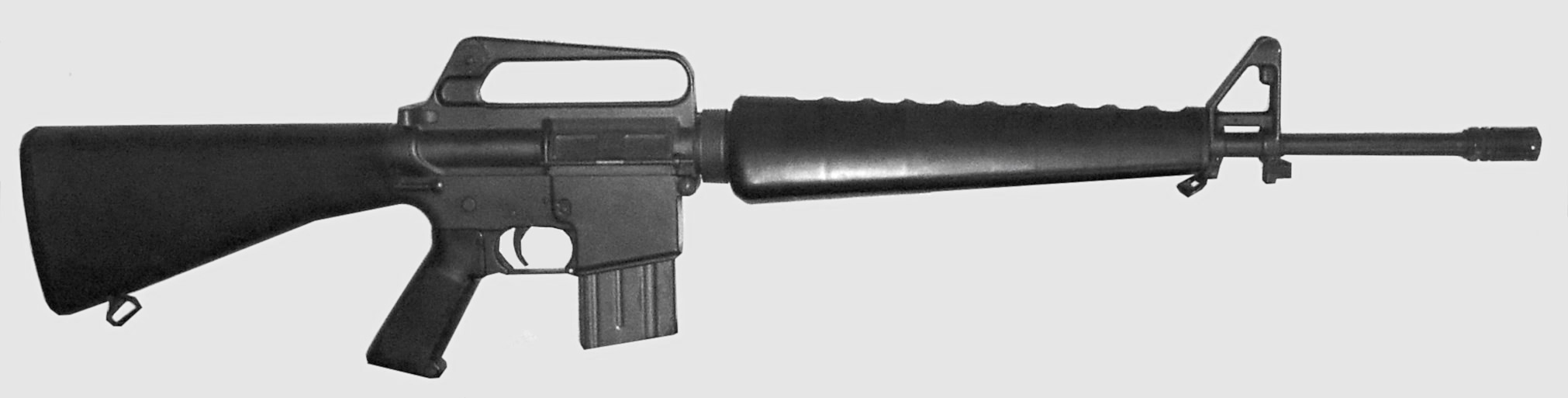
Colt AR-15 SP1 - .223 Remington

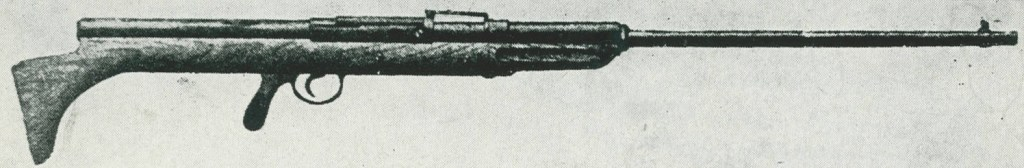
Drawing of the Mannlicher 1885 semi-automatic rifle by Ferdinand Mannlicher, one of the earliest semi-automatic rifle designs.

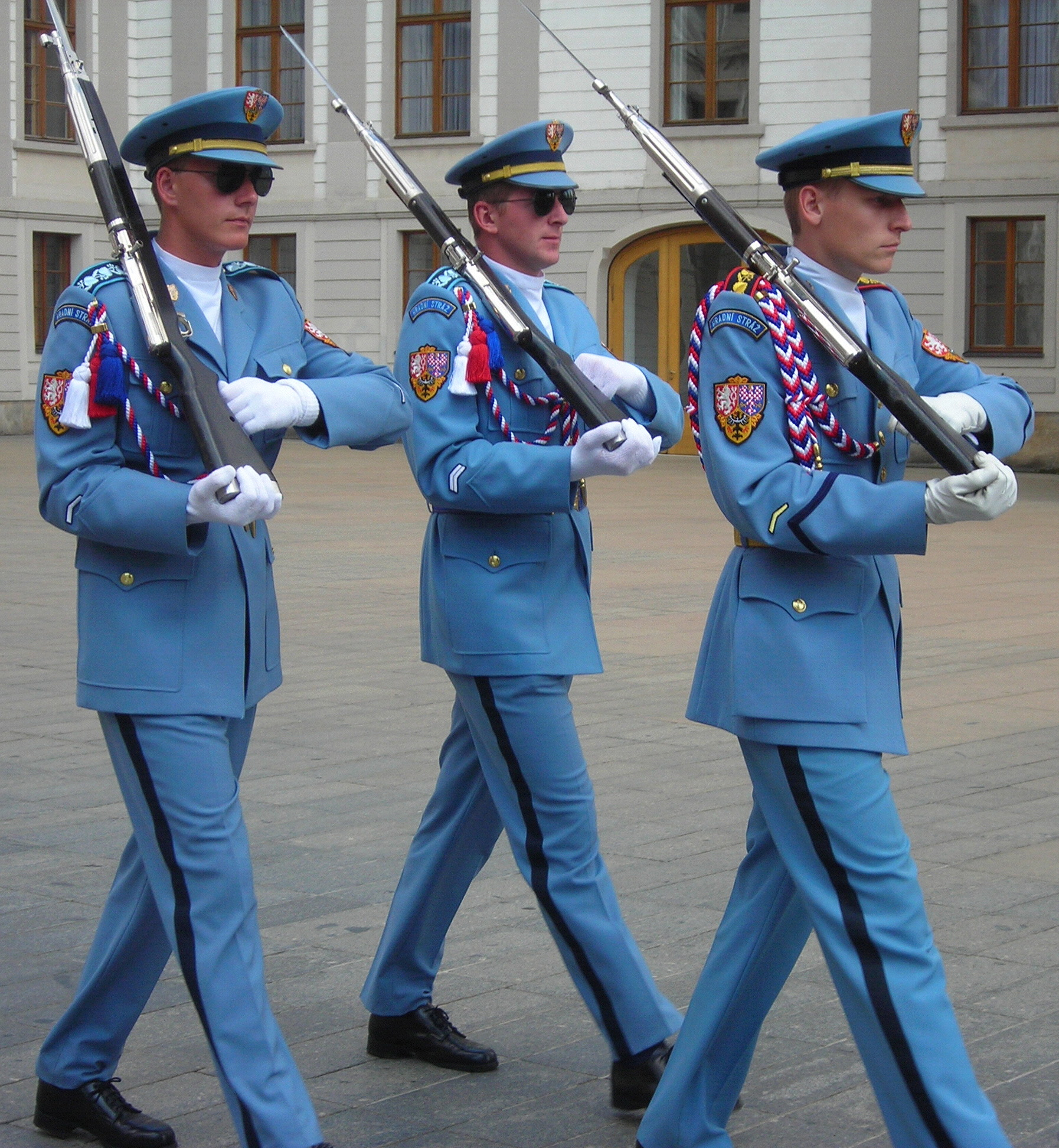
Prague Castle Guard carrying the Czechoslovak vz. 52 rifle

A semi-automatic rifle is a type of self-loading rifle that fires a single round each time the trigger is pulled while automatically loading the next cartridge. Such rifles were developed before World War II and were widely used throughout that war. Rifles are firearms designed to be fired while held with both hands and braced against the shooter's shoulder for stability. Externally similar shotguns can fire multiple pellets simultaneously through a smoothbore, while rifle barrels are rifled to spin-stabilize individual bullets. The actions of semi-automatic rifles use a portion of the fired cartridge's energy to eject the spent casing and load a new round into the chamber, readying the rifle to be fired again. This design differs from manually operated rifles such as bolt-action and lever-action rifles, which need to chamber a cartridge manually before firing again, and automatic rifles, which continue firing as long as the trigger remains depressed.

== History ==
=== Recoil-operated rifles ===
In 1883, Hiram Maxim patented a recoil-operated conversion of a Winchester rifle. Another early design for a recoil-operated semi-automatic rifle was by Ferdinand Mannlicher, who unveiled his design in 1885, building on earlier work from 1883. Several of his early models, including the Mannlicher Model 85, the 91, the 93, and the 95, used non-gas-operated mechanisms. However, the designs remained prototypes because of challenges associated with the black powder used in their cartridges (based around the Austrian 11×58 mm R M/77), such as low velocity and excessive fouling. The adoption of smokeless powder later facilitated the practical development of fully-automatic and semi-automatic firearms.

Mannlicher's designs contributed to the evolution of later firearms, including the Browning M1917, M1919, and M2 Browning machine guns. In the early 1880s, Mannlicher began producing versions of his rifles designed for smokeless powder, continuing his work until his death on January 20 1904.

In 1883, Artillery Officer Wilhelm H. O. Madsen and Julius A. N. Rasmussen, the attendant of the Copenhagen arms factory, initiated the development of recoil-operated self-loading firearm designs. By 1887, they had produced a functional prototype, later designated the M1888 Forsøgsrekylgevær. The Danish military tested this rifle but ultimately didn't adopt it. Subsequently, the pair developed a new design known as the M1896 Flaadens Rekylgevær. This model underwent testing by the Danish military and was deemed reliable. Consequently, 60 units were procured for the Danish Navy, making it one of the earliest semi-automatic rifles officially adopted by a military force.

In 1906, Remington Arms introduced the Remington Auto-loading Repeating Rifle which was renamed the Model 8 in 1911 and marketed as a sporting rifle. It was sold in Europe by FN Herstal as the FN Browning 1900. The rifle is a locked breech, long recoil action designed by John Browning, and had .25, .30, .32, and .35 caliber variants. In 1936, the Model 81 superseded the Model 8 and was offered in .300 Savage as well as the original Remington calibers.

=== Blowback-operated rifles ===
In 1903 and 1905, the Winchester Repeating Arms Company introduced the first low-power blowback (shell-operated) semi-automatic rifles firing Rimfire and center fire ammunition. The Winchester Model 1903 and the Winchester Model 1905 both operated on the blowback principle to function. Designed by Thomas C. Johnson, the Model 1903 was commercially successful and remained in production until 1932 – when it was succeeded by the Winchester Model 63.

By the early 20th century, several manufacturers began producing semi-automatic .22 caliber rifles, including Winchester, Remington, Fabrique Nationale, and Savage Arms, all using the direct blowback system of operation. Winchester later introduced a .351 Winchester Self-Loading semi-automatic rifle, the Model 1907, as an upgraded version of the Model 1905 offering greater power than its .22 caliber predecessor and utilizing a blowback system. Both the Model 1905 and Model 1907 saw limited military and police use.

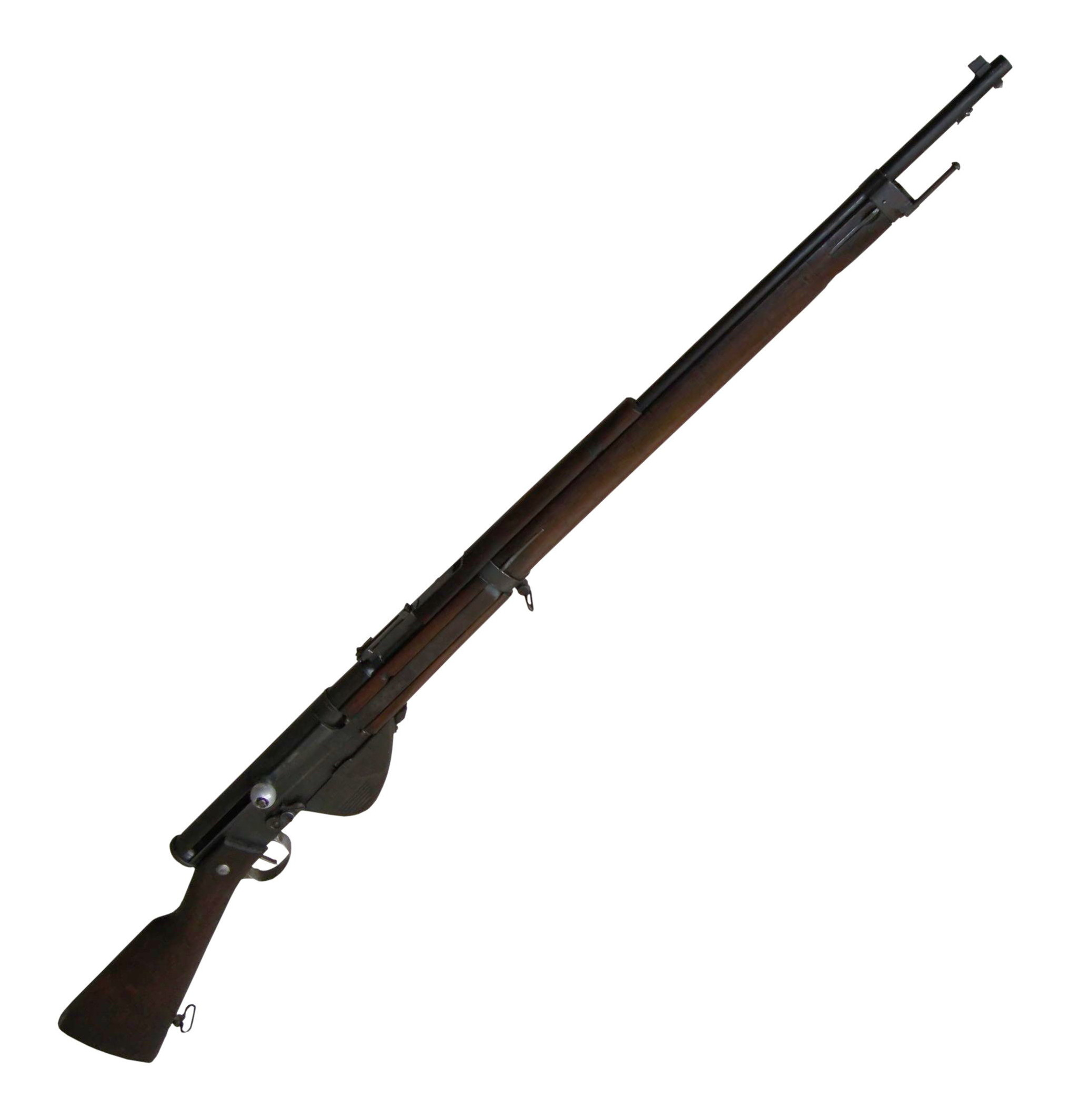
The Fusil Automatique Modele 1917 was an early French semi-automatic rifle issued in limited numbers to the French Armed Forces during World War I.

=== Gas-operated rifles ===
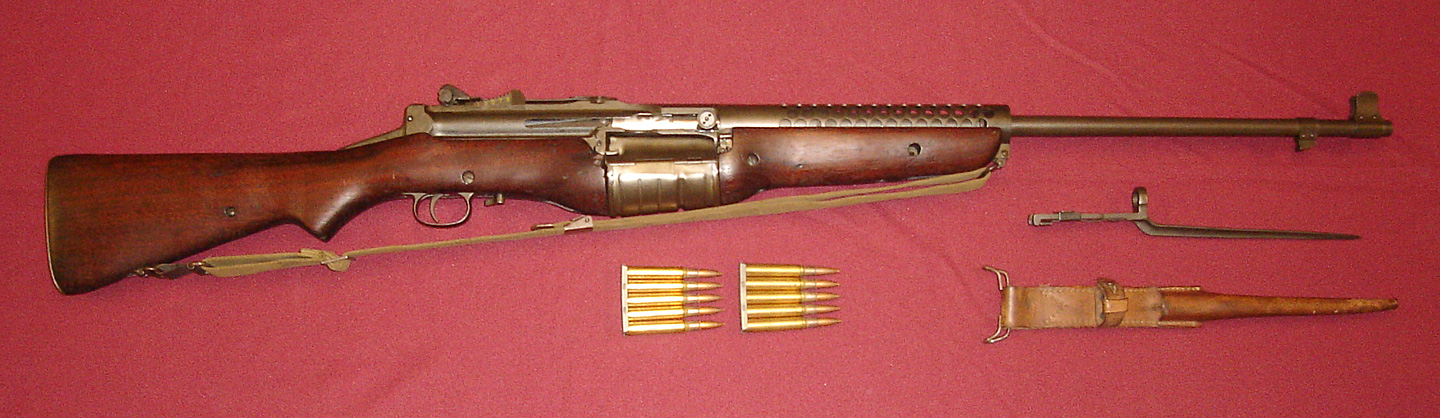
M1941 Johnson rifle Semi-Automatic Rifle with original spike bayonet and leather sheath. The 10-round rotary magazine could be quickly reloaded using two clips of .30 Caliber M2 Ball ammunition.

In the final years of the 19th century and the early 20th century, experiments and patents with gas-operated reloading systems were developed by Hiram Maxim and Richard Paulson as well as a gas-operated conversion system from an American inventor named Henry Pitcher. Other designs were also developed, such as the Cei-Rigotti in 1900.

In 1908, General Manuel Mondragón patented the Mondragón rifle, designated the M1908. The rifle was used by Mexican forces in the Mexican Revolution, making Mexico the first nation to use a semi-automatic rifle in battle, in 1911.

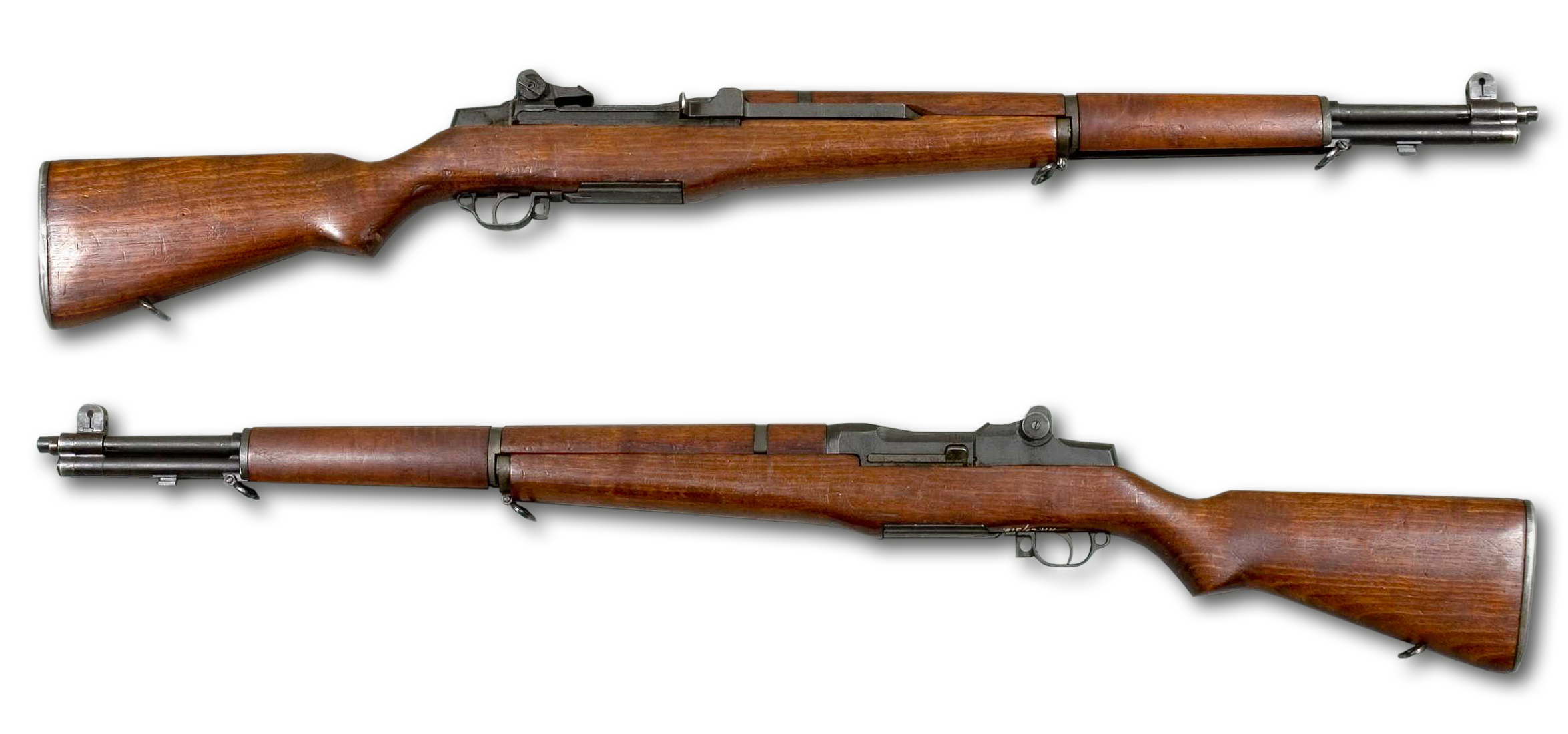
The M1 Garand was designed by John Garand in 1936 and initially produced for the United States military.

Shortly after the Mondragón rifle was produced, France introduced its semi-automatic rifle, the Fusil Automatique Modele 1917, also known as the Repetier-Selbstlader-Gewehr M1917 (RSC M1917). The Modele 1917 had a locked breech, gas-operated action that was similar in its mechanical principles to the American M1 Garand. However, the shortened and improved version, the Model 1918, saw more use during the Moroccan Rif War from 1921 to 1926. The bolt-action Lebel Model 1886 rifle remained the standard French infantry rifle until it began to be replaced in 1936 by another bolt-action rifle, the MAS-36.

The United Kingdom experimented with self-loading rifles during the interwar period, intending to replace the bolt-action Lee–Enfield with a self-loading rifle. This plan was discarded when the Second World War became imminent and the United Kingdom hastily rearmed with more traditional weapons designs.

In Springfield, Massachusetts, John Garand, a Canadian-born firearms designer, was tasked with designing a basic gas-actuated self-loading infantry rifle and carbine rifle that would eject the spent cartridge and reload a new round using a gas-operated system. It took 15 years to perfect the M1 prototype model to meet all the U.S. Army specifications. The resulting Semi-Automatic, .30 caliber, M1 Rifle was patented by Garand in 1932, approved by the U.S. Army on January 9, 1936, and underwent mass production in 1940. General George S. Patton described the M1 Garand as "the greatest battle implement ever devised." It replaced the bolt action M1903 Springfield and was the first gas-operated semi-automatic rifle adopted as a national standard-issue service rifle, and was often referred to as the "Garand Rifle". During World War II, over 4,000,000 M1 rifles were manufactured.

The Soviet AVS-36, SVT-38, and SVT-40, as well as the German Gewehr 41 and Gewehr 43, were semi-automatic gas-operated rifles issued during World War II in relatively small numbers. In practice, they did not replace the bolt-action rifle as a standard infantry weapon of their respective nations—Germany produced 402,000 Gewehr 43 rifles, and over 14,000,000 of the Kar98k.

Another gas-operated semi-automatic rifle developed toward the end of World War II was the SKS. Designed by Sergei Gavrilovich Simonov in 1945, it came equipped with a bayonet and could be loaded with ten rounds using a stripper clip. It was the first widely issued rifle to use the 7.62×39mm cartridge. By the end of World War II, however, semi-automatic rifles had been largely superseded in military usage by their select-fire counterparts - weapons such as the AK-47, FN FAL, and M16 limited the viability of widespread deployment of semi-automatic rifles.

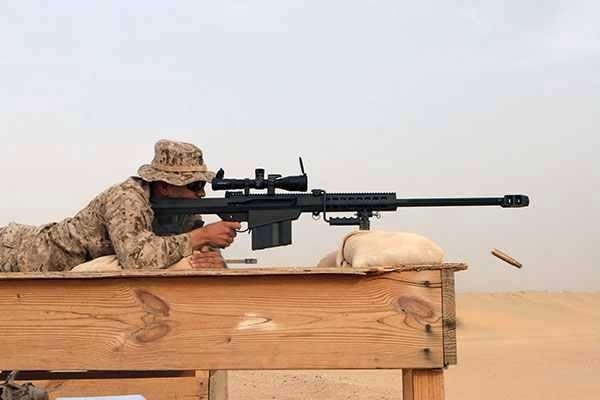
U.S. Marine with a Barrett M82

Gradually, military doctrine increasingly prioritised the volume of fire over individual marksmanship. During World War II, American ground forces fired approximately 25,000 rounds for each enemy killed. This number rose to 50,000 rounds in the Korean War, and rose again, to 200,000, during the Vietnam War. The first fully-automatic rifle to see widespread usage was the German STG-44, which was reportedly well-liked by troops, as the 30-round select-fire rifle gave them much more flexibility than the bolt-action Karabiner 98k.

Ultimately, fully-automatic rifles would become standard in military usage, as their firepower was superior to that of a semi-automatic rifle. However, both semi-automatic and bolt-action rifles are still widely used today in military service in specific roles, such as designated marksman rifles, which prioritize accuracy over volume of fire. Furthermore, to accommodate for this greater firepower, battle rifles were mostly replaced by assault rifles, whose lighter bullets allowed more ammunition to be carried at once. Where semi-automatic rifles continue to be used, they are usually in higher calibers, such as the .50 BMG Barrett M82.

== Operation ==
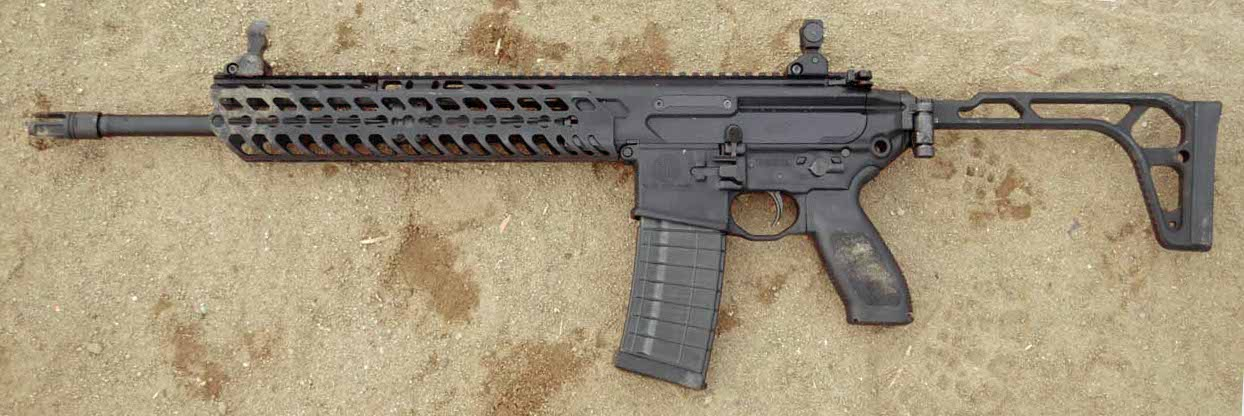
SIG Sauer MCX

Semi-automatic rifles use gas, blow-forward, blow-back, or recoil energy to eject the casing after a round has been fired, to chamber a new cartridge from the magazine, and to reset the action. This enables another round to be fired once the trigger is depressed again.

Semi-automatic rifles can be fed by an en-bloc clip, external magazine, or stripper clip.

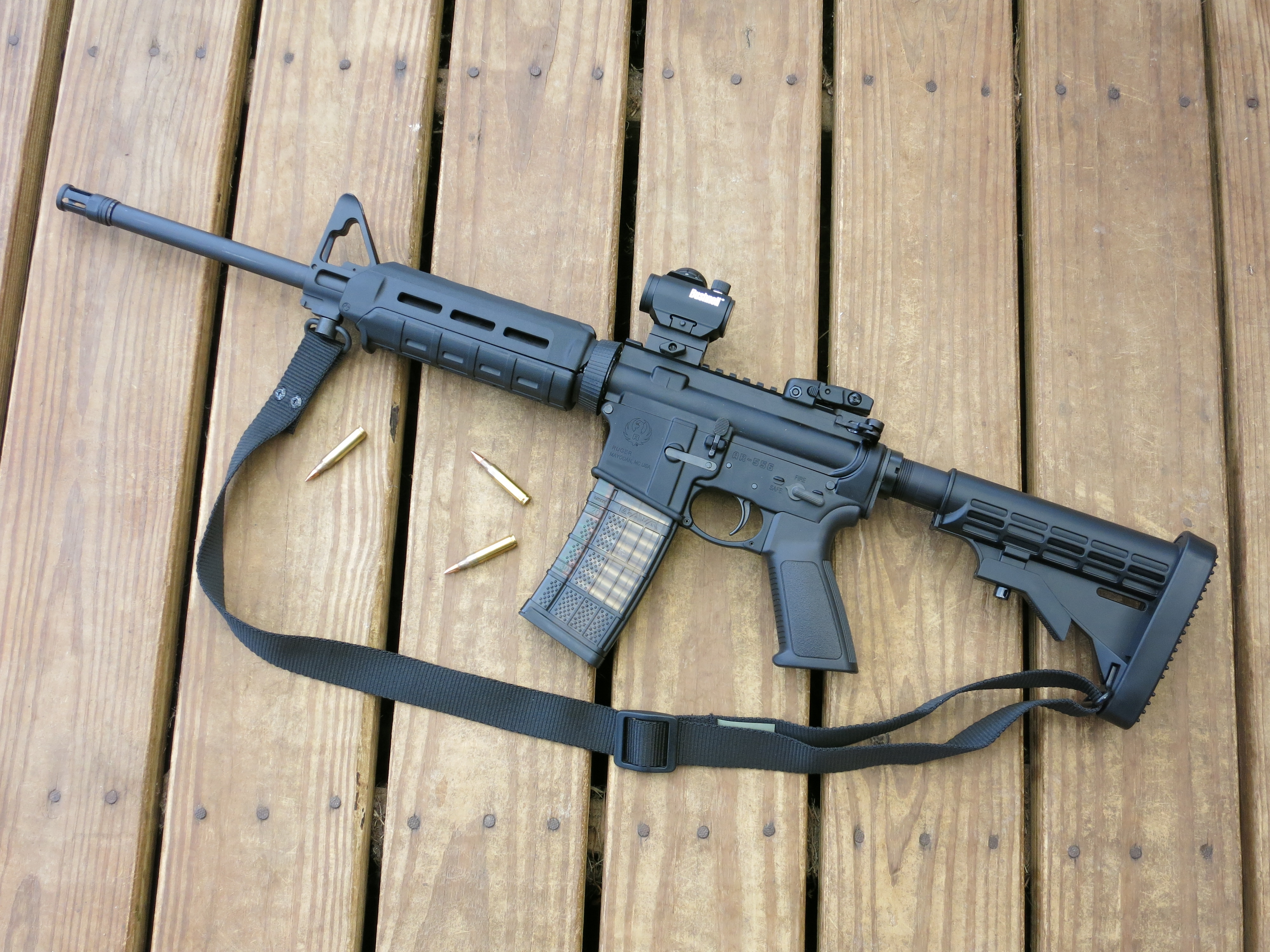
Ruger AR-556.

== Advantages ==
The primary advantage of semi-automatic rifles is their ability to fire multiple sequential shots without manually chambering cartridges, increasing rate of fire and allowing the shooter to maintain their aiming position. Repeatedly engaging single or multiple targets rapidly greatly increases the effectiveness of a firearm in most applications. Semi-automatic rifles can typically more than double the hits at close range and increase hits by about 50% at longer distances compared to manually loaded rifles. The added weight of springs and fittings in self-loading mechanisms, along with some of the cartridge energy being used to reload, can help reduce recoil. Reduced recoil helps keep the rifle on target for successive shots, improving overall accuracy.

== Disadvantages ==
A self-loading mechanism designed for specific cartridge dimensions and power may fail to reload dirty or bent cartridges, struggle to extract low-power training cartridges, or be damaged by cartridges of excessively high power. Some rifles require lubricated cartridges, making them prone to collecting dirt. Reliability issues in the mechanism can negate the advantage of faster firing, potentially lowering the rate of fire compared to manually loaded rifles if not designed for easy manual reloading. The United Kingdom regarded the reliable rate of fire from manually loaded rifles as nearly as high as self-loading rifles as recently as World War II.

Semi-automatic rifles are uniquely susceptible to slamfire malfunctions caused by abrupt cartridge acceleration during self-loading. Slamfire discharges are unlikely to hit the target and may cause collateral damage.

The time required for changing or reloading magazines can reduce the effectiveness of a rifle, as it imposes a duration limit on the continuous rate of fire. High-capacity magazines increase the rifle's weight and typically reduce feeding reliability due to the varying spring tension ranging from a full magazine to a nearly empty magazine. Additionally, detachable magazines are generally less durable than internal magazines.

The complexity of a self-loading mechanism makes self-loading rifles more expensive to manufacture and heavier than manually loaded rifles. The semi-automatic M1 Garand weighs about 410 grams (0.9 lbs.) more than the bolt-action M1903 Springfield it replaced, an increase of seven percent. American development of a self-loading infantry rifle began with the .276 Pedersen cartridge in recognition of the difficulties of producing reliable self-loading mechanisms for more powerful cartridges. Although the M1 Garand was ultimately adapted to fire the .30-06 Springfield cartridge at the insistence of General Douglas MacArthur, most subsequent self-loading rifles for infantry use have been chambered for less powerful cartridges to reduce weight, making the service rifles easier to carry.

== Select examples ==
- Winchester Model 1903
- Remington Model 8
- Winchester Model 1905
- Winchester Model 1907
- Meunier rifle
- Winchester Model 1910
- Mondragón rifle
- General Liu rifle
- Mauser M1916
- M1917 RSC
- Farquhar-Hill Rifle
- M1922 Bang rifle
- Thompson Autorifle
- Pedersen rifle
- ZH-29
- M1 Garand
- Kbsp wz. 1938M
- Armaguerra Mod. 39 rifle
- SVT
- Gewehr 41
- M1941 Johnson rifle
- PTRS-41
- Ag m/42
- M1 Carbine
- Gewehr 43
- Type 4 rifle
- FN Model 1949
- MAS-49
- SKS
- vz. 52
- Dragunov Rifle
- Hakim rifle
- Rasheed Carbine
- AR-10
- AR-15
- L1A1 Rifle
- Heckler & Koch PSG1
- Heckler & Koch SL8
- Heckler & Koch SL7
- Heckler & Koch SL6
- Springfield Armory M1A
- Ruger Mini-14
- Ruger 10/22
- Marlin Model 60
- Remington Model 7400
- Walther WA2000
- Smith & Wesson M&P15-22
- Barrett M82

== Civilian uses for semi-automatic rifles ==
=== Sport shooting ===
Semi-automatic rifles are often used for sport shooting. There are various types of sport shooting, ranging from rapid-fire, target, and distance shooting. Shooting clubs in America became increasingly common in the 1830s, and have since grown in popularity.

=== Hunting ===
Semi-automatic rifles have grown in popularity among hunters. Some hunters use semi-automatic rifles, including AR-15 style models, citing their compact design and customization options, effectively making it easier to traverse rugged terrain while tracking a target and providing a large variety of customization ranging from scopes and muzzle devices to different calibers. Semi-automatic fire greatly assists in maintaining one's sight picture, which is especially important when follow-up shots are required. Due to their demand, the manufacturers of semi-automatic firearms have greatly increased the effective firing distance of their products compared to the first semi-automatics sold on the civilian market.

== See also ==
- Assault rifle (not to be confused with "Assault weapon")
- Assault weapon - certain semi-automatic rifles are classified as assault weapons in some jurisdictions
- Firearm
  - Pistol
  - Revolver
  - Semi-automatic pistol
- AR-15 style rifle
- Personal defense weapon
- Rifle
  - Automatic rifle
  - Bolt-action rifle
- Semi-automatic firearm
  - Semi-automatic pistol
  - Semi-automatic shotgun
- Shotgun
- Single-shot
- List of semi-automatic rifles
- AK-47 Assault Rifle
