= SL6 =

SL6 may refer to one of the following:

- Heckler & Koch SL6, a rifle
- London Buses route SL6
- SL6, a postcode district in the SL postcode area in the United Kingdom
