= .35 Winchester Self-Loading =

Rifle cartridge

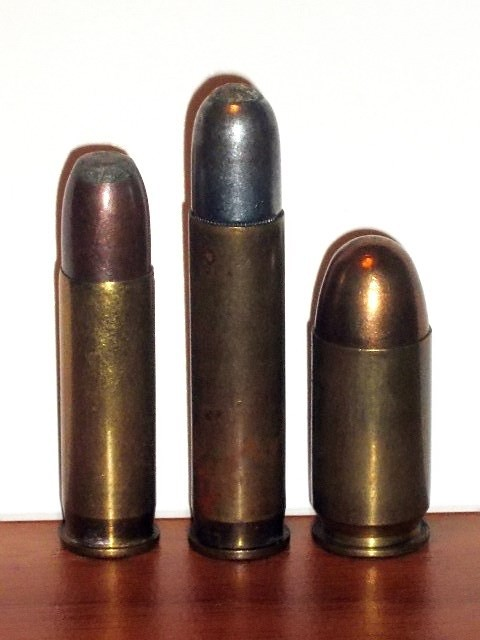
- From left to right: .35 Winchester Self-Loading,.351 Winchester Self-Loading, .45 ACP
- Type: Rifle
- Place of origin: United States

Production history
- Designer: Winchester Repeating Arms Company

Specifications
- Case type: Semi-rimmed, straight
- Bullet diameter: .351 in (8.9 mm)
- Neck diameter: .377 in (9.6 mm)
- Base diameter: .381 in (9.7 mm)
- Rim diameter: .405 in (10.3 mm)
- Rim thickness: 0.05 in (1.3 mm)
- Case length: 1.154 in (29.3 mm)
- Overall length: 1.65 in (42 mm)
- Rifling twist: 1 in 16
- Primer type: Small rifle

Ballistic performance
| Bullet mass/type | Velocity | Energy |
|---|---|---|
| 180 gr (12 g) | 1,396 ft/s (426 m/s) | 779 ft⋅lbf (1,056 J) |
- Test barrel length: 22

The .35 Winchester Self-Loading (.35SL / .35SLR / .35WSL) or 8.9x29mmSR is an American rifle cartridge.

== Overview ==
Winchester introduced the .32SL and .35SL in the Winchester '05 self-loading rifle as a centerfire cartridge version of the Winchester '03. The .35SL proved popular at first with the general public as a short-range deer and black bear hunting cartridge, but was soon superseded by the introduction of the more powerful .351SL in the Winchester '07.

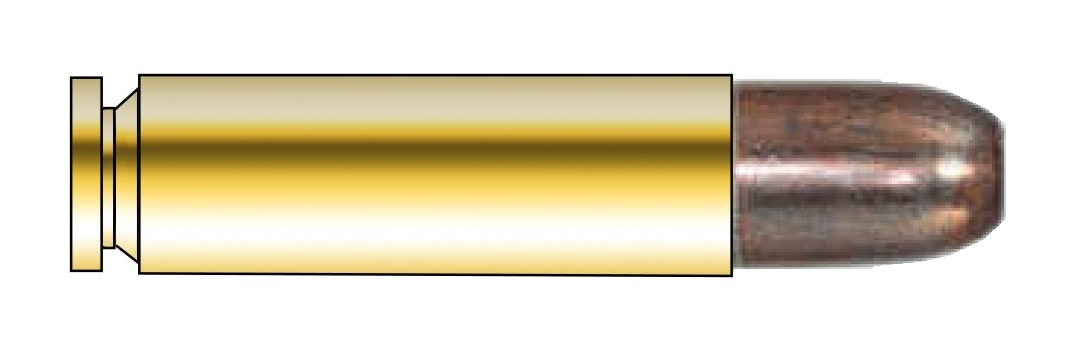
.35 Winchester Self-Loading cartridge diagram.

Many now consider the .35SL inadequate as a deer round, but it may still be suitable for coyote or similar medium-sized game at close ranges. When first introduced however, the notable firearm expert Townsend Whelen noted the .35SL cartridge as displaying similar ballistics as the .38-40 black powder, low-pressure cartridge.

== Dimensions ==
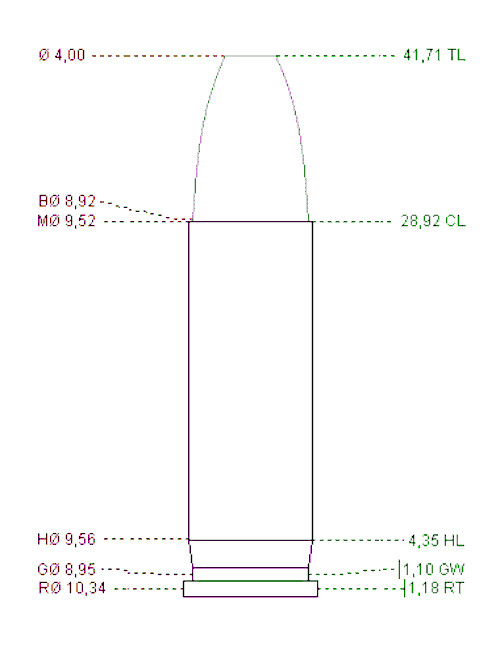

== See also ==
- List of cartridges by caliber
- Table of handgun and rifle cartridges
- 9mm caliber
