= Winchester Model 1910 =

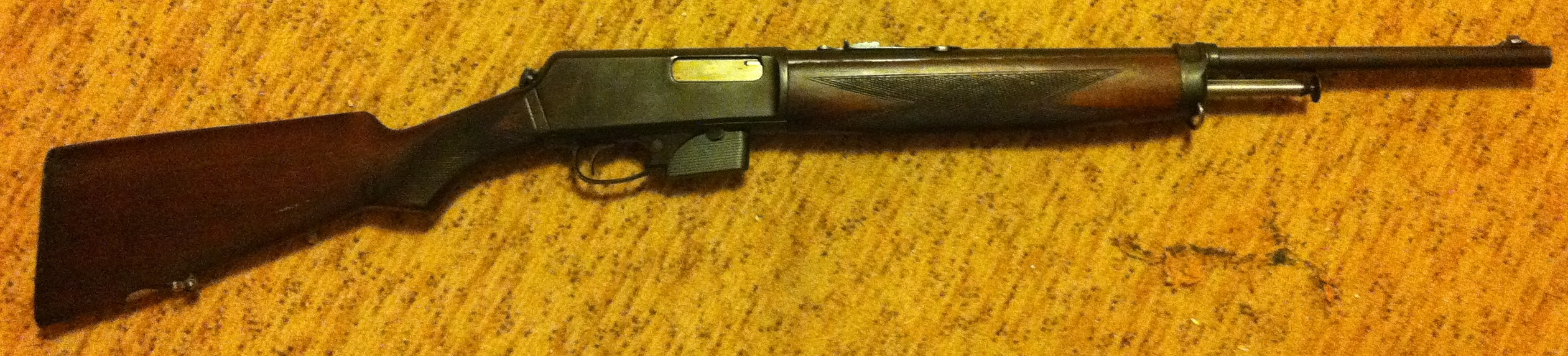
- Type: Semi-automatic rifle
- Place of origin: United States

Service history
- Used by: France; Russia
- Wars: World War I

Production history
- Designer: T.C. Johnson
- Designed: 1901
- Manufacturer: Winchester Repeating Arms Company
- Produced: 1910 to 1936
- No. built: 20,787
- Variants: "Plain" and "Fancy Finish" Rifles

Specifications
- Mass: 8 lb (3.6 kg) to 9 lb (4.1 kg)
- Length: 38 in (970 mm)
- Barrel length: 20 in (510 mm)
- Cartridge: .401 Winchester Self-Loading
- Action: Blowback
- Rate of fire: Semi-automatic
- Feed system: Detachable 4-round box magazine
- Sights: Open iron sights and optional tang or receiver-mounted aperture sights

The Winchester Model 1910 (also known as the Model 10) is a blowback operated semi-automatic rifle produced by the Winchester Repeating Arms Company beginning in 1910 with production ending in 1936. This rifle is fed from a 4-round capacity, detachable box magazine located immediately forward of the trigger guard. Winchester only chambered the model 1910 in the .401 Winchester Self-Loading or .401 WSL cartridge.

The basic design for the Model 1910 is covered by *U.S. patent 681,481 issued August 27, 1901 and assigned to Winchester by Thomas Crossley Johnson, a key firearms designer for Winchester. This patent was initially used to protect the design of the rimfire Winchester Model 1903, but came to be applied toward the centerfire Winchester Self Loading rifle series, which includes the Model 1905, Model 1907, and Model 1910.

== Variants ==
In addition to the standard or "plain finish" model, a deluxe or "fancy finish" model was offered with checkering on the forearm and wrist of the stock. The plain finish rifles were offered in 1910 at a list price of $30 (equivalent to $1,037 in 2025).

== World War I Orders ==
French Third Republic

Winchester factory records show an order placed in 1915 for 150 Model 1910 rifles, spare magazines, and 25,000 cartridges of .401SL ammunition by the firm of Andre, Schaub & Pioso as an agent of the French government. A subsequent December 7, 1917 order of 400,000 .401SL cartridges is believed to indicate additional Model 1910 rifles were acquired by the French Republic through other means.

They were carried by aircraft observers to ward off fighters, a step between pistols and dedicated aircraft machineguns. They were later gradually replaced from 1916 onward by the .351-caliber Winchester Model 1907s. The Model M1907 rifle won out because it had been adopted in larger numbers and because it was also adopted by Britain's Royal Flying Corps and Royal Naval Air Service.

Russian Empire

Winchester records show orders of about 500 Model 1910 rifles by the Imperial Russian government dating to 1915 and 1916. Further details are not available regarding orders of .401SL.
