= Heckler & Koch SL7 =

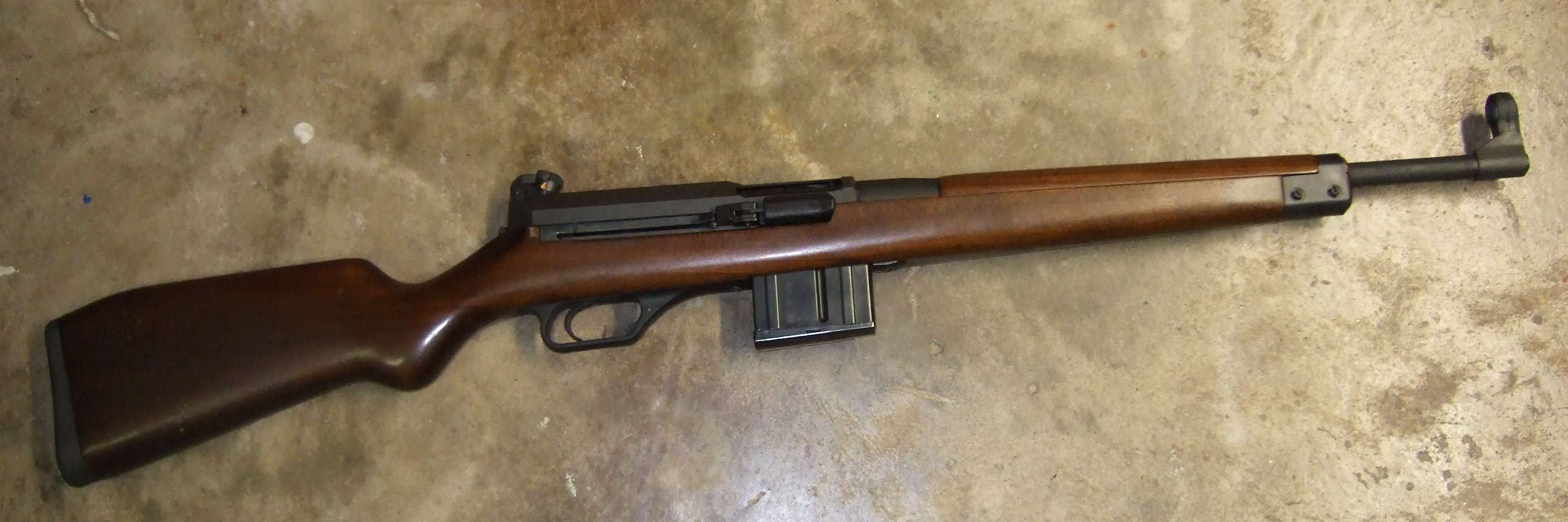
- Heckler-Koch SL7 rifle with 10-round magazine
- Type: Semi-automatic rifle
- Place of origin: Germany

Production history
- Manufacturer: Heckler & Koch
- Produced: 1980s - 1991
- Variants: H&K SL6, H&K 770, H&K 940

Specifications
- Mass: 8.36 pounds (3.6 kg) unloaded
- Length: 39.76 in (1010 mm)
- Barrel length: 17.71 in (450 mm)
- Cartridge: .308 Winchester; 7.62×51mm NATO.30-06 Springfield (H&K 940); 7×64mm (H&K 940)
- Action: Roller-delayed blowback
- Rate of fire: Semi-automatic
- Feed system: 3 or 10-round single column, detachable box magazine
- Sights: Rotary rear aperture drum, hooded foresight

The Heckler & Koch SL7 is a roller-delayed blowback operated sporting carbine made by Heckler & Koch. It is chambered in 7.62×51mm NATO caliber and designed and marketed throughout the world as a hunting/utility rifle.

Unlike the roller-delayed blowback military Heckler & Koch rifles the cocking handle is situated far more rearward and on the right side and features a camming system to help overcome the initial friction exerted by the "bolt head locking lever" anti-bounce mechanism that prevents the bolt from bouncing off the barrel's breech surface.

The SL7 is no longer manufactured, having been replaced by the Heckler & Koch SLB 2000.

== Variants ==
The HK 770, a hunting rifle 7.62×51mm NATO/.308 Winchester variant of the Heckler & Koch SL7, lacked the wooden handguard of the SL7 and was equipped with a longer barrel with integral flash hider/compensator slots at the end of the barrel, open rear leaf sights, and sporting-style buttstock.
The HK 940, a hunting rifle long action variant of the Heckler & Koch SL7, designed for using cartridges exceeding the 7.62×51mm NATO/.308 Winchester 2.8 in (71.12 mm) overall length like the .30-06 Springfield or 7×64mm and lacked the wooden handguard of the SL7 and was equipped with a longer barrel with integral flash hider/compensator slots at the end of the barrel, open rear leaf sights, and sporting-style buttstock.
The Heckler & Koch SL6 is similar to the Heckler & Koch SL7, but is chambered for 5.56×45mm NATO.
