= Ribeyrolles 1918 automatic carbine =

Type of automatic rifle/assault rifle

Carabine-mitrailleuse Ribeyrolles Modèle 1918
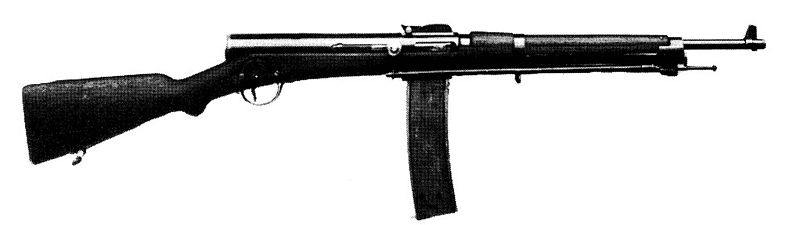
- Ribeyrolles 1918
- Type: Automatic rifle
- Place of origin: France

Production history
- Designer: Ribeyrolles
- Designed: 1916
- Produced: 1916 to 1920
- No. built: 1 (conjecture)

Specifications
- Mass: 5.1 kg (11 lb) unloaded
- Length: 1,090 mm (43 in)
- Barrel length: 450 mm (18 in)
- Cartridge: 8×35mm Ribeyrolles
- Action: Direct blowback
- Rate of fire: 550–600 rounds per minute
- Muzzle velocity: 570 m/s (1,900 ft/s)
- Effective firing range: 400 m (440 yd)
- Feed system: 25-round box magazine
- Sights: Iron sights

The Ribeyrolles 1918 was an attempt to manufacture an automatic rifle for the French forces. It was chambered in the experimental 8×35mm round, used straight blowback, was fed from a 25-round detachable magazine and had an effective range of 400 meters. The cartridge, which some argue was the first purpose-built intermediate cartridge, was obtained by necking down the .351 Winchester Self-Loading. Another source indicates that it was chambered in a cartridge designated 8×32mmSR.

Its official name was Carabine Mitrailleuse 1918 ("Machine Carbine 1918" in English); in a 2007 book it appears as "fusil automatique Ribeyrolles 1918". The Ribeyrolles had the distinction of being fitted with a lightweight bipod on the front (indicating an intended use as a squad automatic weapon) and a rifle bayonet identical to that of the Berthier Model 1907/15.

== See also ==
- Chauchat-Ribeyrolles 1918 submachine gun
- Fedorov Avtomat
- Fusil Automatique Modèle 1917
- MP 18
- Vollmer M35
