= Heckler & Koch SL6 =

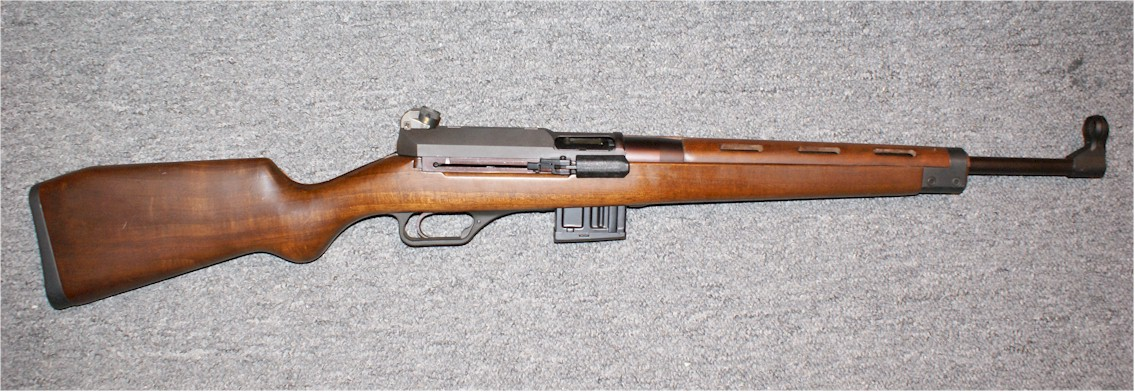
- Heckler & Koch SL6 with 10-round magazine
- Type: Semi-automatic rifle
- Place of origin: Germany

Production history
- Manufacturer: Heckler & Koch
- Produced: 1980s-1991
- Variants: SL6A2, SL7

Specifications
- Mass: 7.92 pounds (3.6 kg) unloaded
- Length: 39.76 in. (1010mm)
- Barrel length: 17.71 in. (450mm)
- Cartridge: .223 Remington; 5.56×45mm NATO
- Action: Roller-delayed blowback
- Rate of fire: Semi-automatic or Select-fire (Semi, 2-round Burst) (SL6A2)
- Feed system: 3, 4, or 10-round single column, detachable box magazine
- Sights: Rotary rear aperture drum, hooded foresight

The Heckler & Koch SL6 is a roller-delayed blowback operated sporting carbine made by Heckler & Koch. It is chambered in 5.56×45mm NATO. The design was originally based on the Heckler & Koch 630 hunting rifle and is essentially a shorter-barreled version of that rifle. It was marketed throughout the world as a hunting/utility rifle.

Unlike the roller-delayed blowback military Heckler & Koch rifles the cocking handle is situated far more rearward and on the right side and features a camming system to help overcome the initial friction exerted by the "bolt head locking lever" anti-bounce mechanism that prevents the bolt from bouncing off the barrel's breech surface.

The Heckler & Koch SL6 is no longer manufactured, having been replaced by the Heckler & Koch SLB 2000.

== Variants ==
The Heckler & Koch SL6A2 variant is essentially the same rifle; however, the SL6A2 includes a flash hider and offers a two-round burst selector.
The HK 630, a 5.56×45mm NATO/.223 Remington hunting rifle variant of the Heckler & Koch SL6, lacked the wooden handguard of the SL6 and was equipped with a longer barrel with integral flash hider/compensator slots at the end of the barrel, open rear leaf sights, and sporting-style buttstock.
The Heckler & Koch SL7 is a variant chambered in 7.62×51mm NATO.
