= Winchester Model 1905 =

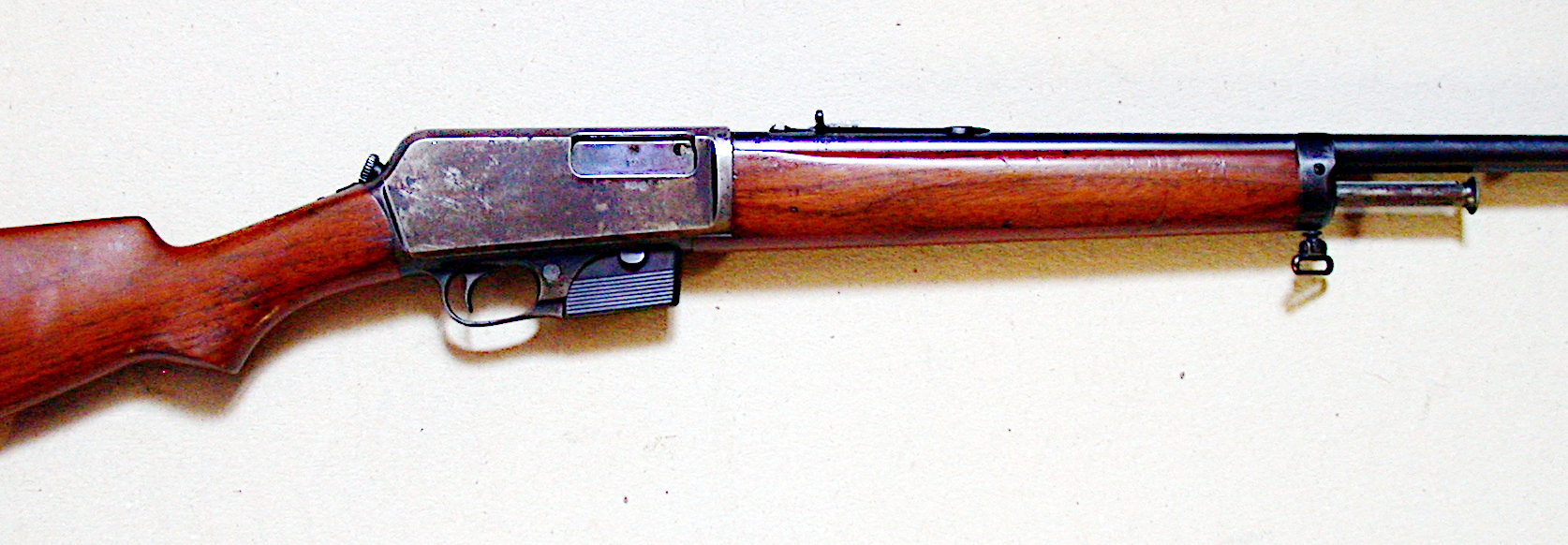
- Type: Semi-automatic rifle
- Place of origin: United States

Production history
- Designer: T.C. Johnson
- Manufacturer: Winchester Repeating Arms Company
- Produced: 1905 to 1920
- No. built: 29,113
- Variants: "Plain" and "Fancy Finish" Rifles

Specifications
- Mass: 7 lb (3.2 kg) to 8 lb (3.6 kg)
- Length: 40 in (1,000 mm)
- Barrel length: 22 in (560 mm)
- Cartridge: .32SL and .35SL
- Action: Blowback
- Rate of fire: Semi-automatic
- Feed system: Detachable 5 and 10-round box magazines
- Sights: Open iron sights and optional tang or receiver-mounted aperture sights

The Winchester Model 1905 (also known as the Model 05), is a blowback-operated, semi-automatic rifle produced by the Winchester Repeating Arms Company beginning in 1905 and discontinued in 1920. This rifle loads cartridges from a 5 or 10-round capacity, detachable box magazine located immediately forward of the trigger guard. Winchester offered factory chamberings in .32SL and .35 Winchester Self-Loading (.35 WSL).

Notably, a Model 1905 in .35 WSL was used by Harry Payne Whitney on an arctic expedition. The rifle proved reliable in extreme low-temperatures, but was insufficiently powerful for taking large game such as musk ox.

The basic design for the Winchester Model 1905 is covered by U.S. patent 681,481 issued August 27, 1901 and assigned to Winchester by Thomas Crossley Johnson, a key firearms designer for Winchester. This patent was initially used to protect the design of the rimfire Winchester Model 1903, but came to be applied toward the centerfire Winchester Self Loading rifle series, which includes the Model 1905, Model 1907 and Model 1910.

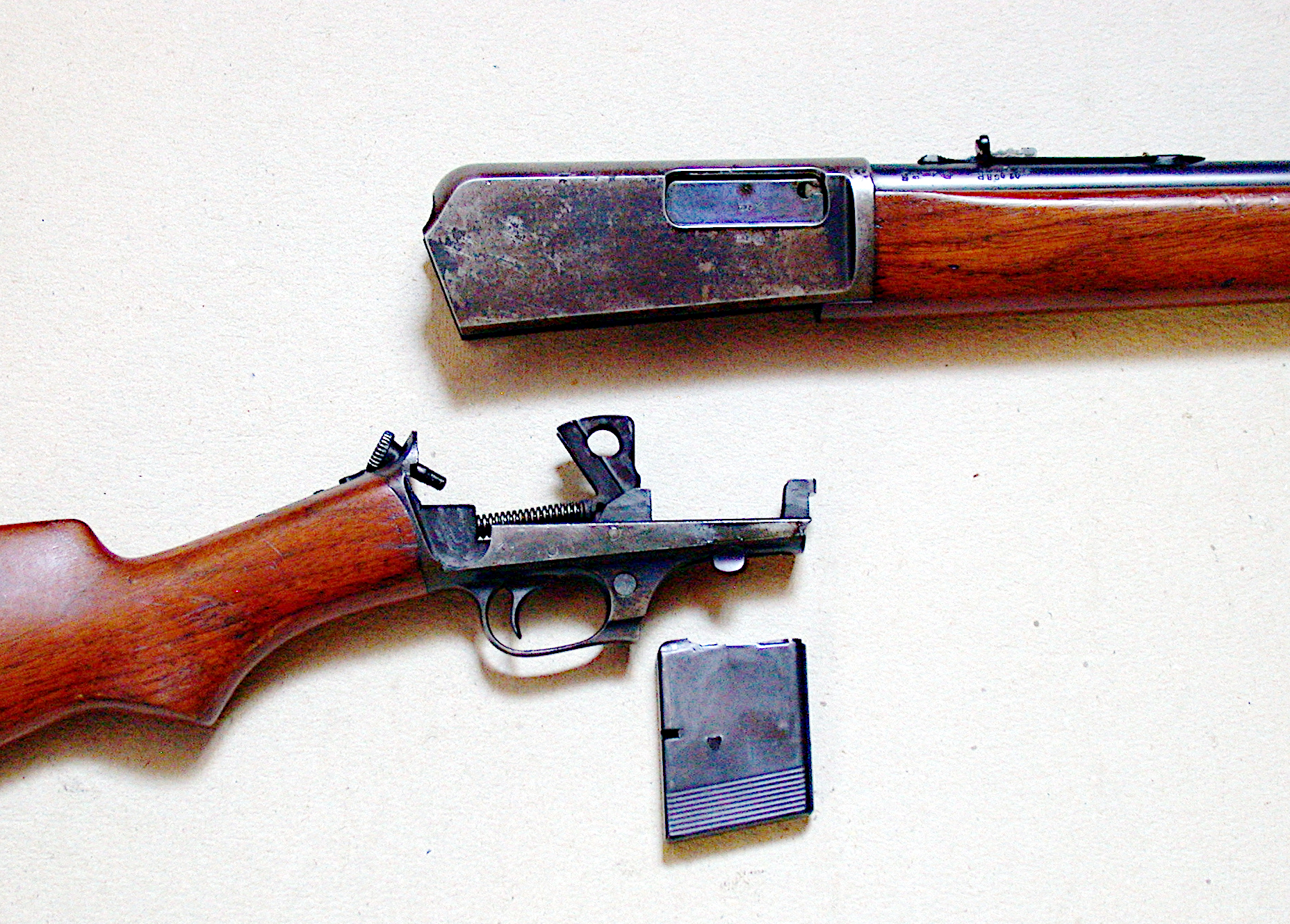
Winchester SL 05 Take Down

In 1941 Winchester designed the M1 Carbine in response to a US Army competition for a light rifle. The designers were able to adapt the Model 1905 trigger group and magazine for the trials rifle which saved on research and development time.

== Variants ==
In addition to the standard or "plain finish" model, a deluxe or "fancy finish" model was offered with pistol grip stock and checkering on the forearm and wrist of the stock. The plain finish rifles were offered in 1905 at a list price of $28, the fancy finish rifles for $43.

=== Woodhull light rifle ===
The Woodhull light rifle was issued by Frederick W. Woodhull of the Woodhull Corporation Millington, NJ. It is a fully automatic variant of Model 1905 chambered in .30 Carbine, it was competing to become the M1 carbine but lost to Winchester. It was submitted in the trails May–June 1941, further improved and submitted in the trails August 1941.

=== Model 1905 .45 ACP Variant ===
A model chambered in .45 ACP which took Colt M1911 magazines was manufactured, the firing port was enlarged, and the magazine was set very high. It was never put into production

=== Model 1905 9mm Parabellum Variant ===
A model chambered in 9×19mm Parabellum which took Luger pistol magazines was manufactured, It was never put into production
