= Winchester Model 1907 =

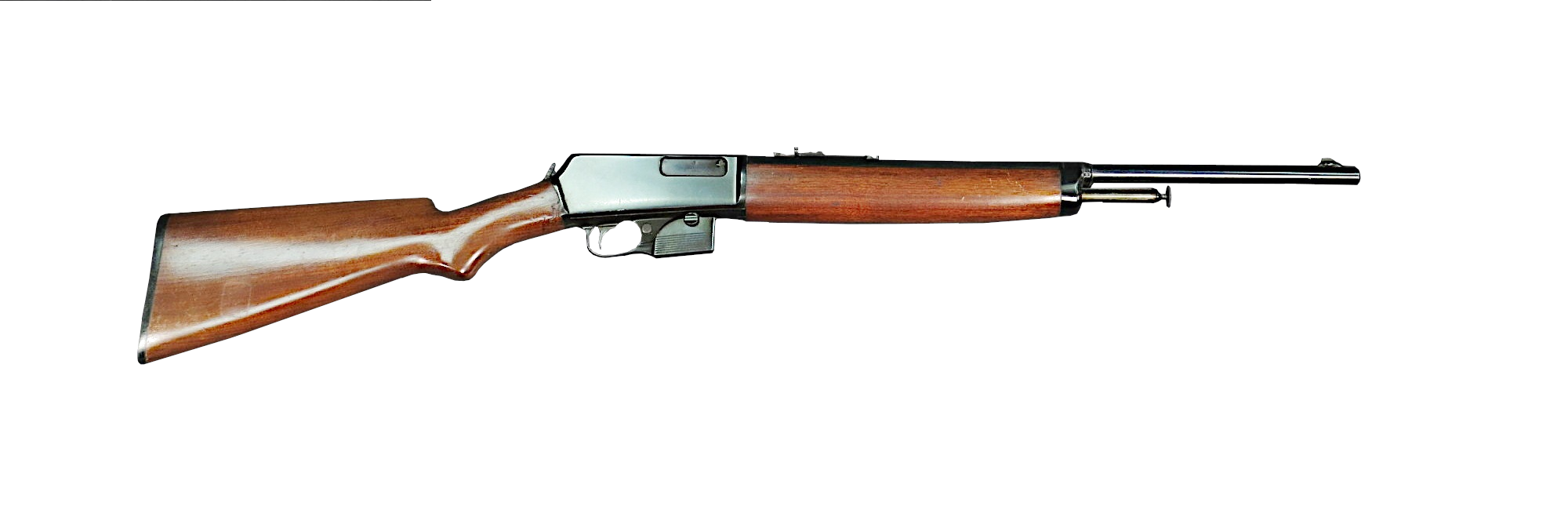
- Type: Semi-automatic rifle
- Place of origin: United States

Service history
- Used by: France; United Kingdom; Russian Empire; United States; Montenegro
- Wars: World War I Russian Civil War; World War II (limited uses)

Production history
- Designer: T.C. Johnson
- Manufacturer: Winchester Repeating Arms Company
- Produced: 1907 to 1957
- No. built: 58,733
- Variants: "Plain" "Fancy Finish" and "Police" rifles

Specifications
- Mass: 8 lb (3.6 kg) to 9 lb (4.1 kg)
- Length: 40 in (1,000 mm)
- Barrel length: 20 in (510 mm)
- Cartridge: .351 Winchester Self-Loading
- Action: Blowback
- Rate of fire: Semi-automatic
- Feed system: Detachable 5, 10 and 20-round box magazines
- Sights: Open iron sights and optional tang or receiver-mounted aperture sights

The Winchester Model 1907 is a blowback-operated, semi-automatic rifle produced by the Winchester Repeating Arms Company beginning in 1907 with production ending in 1957. It fired a cartridge of intermediate power, cycled through a semi-automatic operating mechanism, fed from a 5, 10, or 15 round detachable box magazine located immediately forward of the trigger guard. In size and handling, it is much like an M1 carbine, though the 1907 is heavier and fires a much harder hitting round.

The only cartridge offered by Winchester as a factory chambering in the Model 1907 was the .351SL centerfire. The energy of this cartridge at the muzzle approximates the original loading of the .30-30 or the modern .35 Remington at approximately 75–100 yd (69–91 m).

== Variants ==
In addition to the standard or "plain finish" model, a deluxe or "fancy finish" model was offered with a semi-pistol grip and checkering on the forearm and wrist of the stock. The plain finish rifles were offered in 1907 at a list price of $28 (approximately $730 in 2016). In 1935, Winchester offered a special "police rifle" variant, featuring a non-adjustable rear sight, sling swivels, a larger magazine release, a special barrel measuring 5/8 in (16 mm) at the muzzle, and the rear sight dovetail moved 2 3/8 in (60 mm) rearward. A barrel sleeve with Krag bayonet mount and front sight was also an option with the "police rifle".

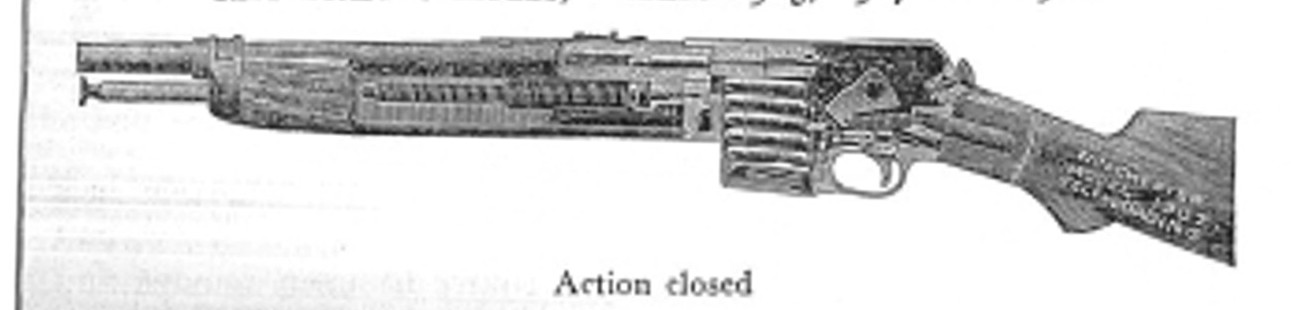
Cross-section of a Winchester Model 1907

In the late 1930s, the 1907 was updated by Winchester with a much thicker fore-end (eliminating the cracking problems common to the earlier models) and stock. The newer model also had a redesigned charging handle which made it easier to lock the bolt back. At the same time, a variant for police use was introduced, featuring an M1892 Krag bayonet lug, and the possibility of using an extended magazine for 20 rounds. For a long time, on the Internet, a photo of a similar rifle from the Cody Firearms Museum (USA), S/N 47357, manufactured in 1935, was presented as a "French order of the First World War", having nothing to do with it.

== Patents ==
The basic design for the Model 1907 is covered by U.S. patent 681,481 issued August 27, 1901, and assigned to Winchester by Thomas Crossley Johnson, a key firearms designer for Winchester. This patent was initially used to protect the design of the rimfire Winchester Model 1903, but came to be applied toward the centerfire Winchester Self Loading rifle series, which includes the Model 1905, Model 1907, and Model 1910.

=== List of Patents ===
- U.S. patent 681,481 Small cartridge, Winchester Model 1903
- U.S. patent 694,157 Box magazine
- U.S. patent 720,698 Large cartridge, self-loading, box magazine, takedown rifle (Winchester Model 1905)
- U.S. patent 747,675 Cartridge extractor
- U.S. patent 829,215 Forearm tip
- U.S. patent 834,578 Recoil buffer
- U.S. patent 963,444 Buttstock bolt

== World War I use ==
=== France ===
The government initially ordered 300 Model 1907 rifles in October 1915 from Winchester, soon followed by an order for 2,500 more rifles. Ammunition orders for these rifles exceeded 1.5 million cartridges of .351SL before 1917. Subsequent orders in 1917 and 1918 totaled 2,200 Model 1907 rifles, giving a total of 5000 rifles bought during the war

From unknown sources, it was previously claimed that allegedly according to factory records, these rifles were modified for fully automatic fire and fitted with Lee-Navy rifle bayonets. These rifles allegedly were designated by the name of Winchester Model 1907/17, they used either a 15-round magazine or 20-round magazine and fired from 600 to 700 rounds per minute. Ultimately, no evidence of this was found; the above configuration was actually introduced by Winchester in the 1930s for police use and these rifles were never converted to full auto.

=== Great Britain ===
According to a November 1, 1916 Winchester internal report, Great Britain's London Armory was sent 120 Model 1907 rifles and 78,000 rounds of .351SL ammunition between December 1914 and April 1916 for use by the Royal Flying Corps. These rifles were specially modified for aerial use by increasing the size of the trigger guard and cocking piece to allow the use of heavy gloves and were intended to use 15-round magazines. These rifles were intended to arm airplane observers.

=== Russia ===
The Imperial Russian government is recorded by Winchester as purchasing 500 Model 1907 rifles and 1.5 million rounds of .351SL ammunition through the J.P. Morgan Company in May 1916.

=== United States ===
During World War I, a shipment of 19 Model 1907 rifles and 9,000 cartridges of .351 Winchester Self-Loading ammunition was delivered to the 1st Aero Squadron of the Aviation Section, U.S. Signal Corps. The shipment was sent to Columbus, New Mexico and was presumably used in arming the squadron's aircraft when it operated in Mexico during the Pancho Villa Expedition.

=== Montenegro ===
A picture of the Montenegrin Royal Guard on a platform in Lyon in 1916 shows one of its members with a Winchester 1907.

== Law enforcement and criminal use ==
The Model 1907 was a popular rifle with law enforcement in the United States during much of its production - especially in the 1930s when the police in the United States were upgrading their firearms due to the increase in crime. The Federal Bureau of Investigation acquired some Model 1907 rifles in response to the 1933 Kansas City Massacre. It was used by Patrol Inspectors of the U.S. Border Patrol during the late 1920s into the 1930s. Great Depression-era bank robbers such as the Dillinger Gang used modified M1907s during their crime sprees. A Model 1907 imported through Germany was also used in the 1908 assassination of Dom Carlos I of Portugal.

The self-loading nature of the Model 1907 allowed for ready conversion to fully automatic fire, a feature taken advantage by organized crime gangs. Several Model 1907's employed by the Dillinger Gang were modified by the gunsmith Hyman Lebman - known for converting Colt Government .38 Super handguns to machine pistols - to be capable of automatic fire. In addition to automatic capability, these modified carbines were altered by barrel shortening and installation of Cutts brand recoil compensators and additional grips, along with commercially available extended magazines. The combination of an intermediate cartridge, automatic fire capability, and moderate recoil lead some historians to refer to these modified Winchester Model 07 carbines as a sort of proto-assault rifle.

== See also ==
- Remington Model 8
- Ribeyrolles 1918 automatic carbine
