= .351 Winchester Self-Loading =

Rifle cartridge

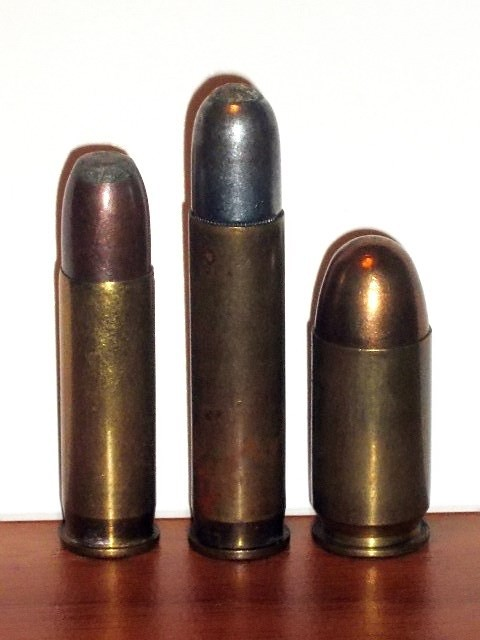
- From left to right: .35 Winchester Self-Loading, .351 Winchester Self-Loading, .45 ACP
- Type: Rifle
- Place of origin: United States

Service history
- Used by: France; United Kingdom; Russia; United States
- Wars: World War I

Production history
- Designer: Winchester Repeating Arms Company
- Designed: 1906

Specifications
- Case type: Semi-rimmed, straight
- Bullet diameter: 0.352 in (8.9 mm)
- Land diameter: 0.345 in (8.8 mm)
- Neck diameter: 0.373 in (9.5 mm)
- Shoulder diameter: 0.377 in (9.6 mm)
- Base diameter: 0.380 in (9.7 mm)
- Rim diameter: 0.410 in (10.4 mm)
- Rim thickness: 0.05 in (1.3 mm)
- Case length: 1.380 in (35.1 mm)
- Overall length: 1.906 in (48.4 mm)
- Rifling twist: 1 in 16
- Primer type: Small rifle
- Maximum pressure: 39,000 psi (270 MPa)
- Maximum CUP: 45,000 CUP

Ballistic performance
Bullet mass/type	Velocity	Energy
180 gr (12 g)	1,870 ft/s (570 m/s)	1,400 ft⋅lbf (1,900 J)
- Test barrel length: 20 in. Sources: Whelen, Townsend. The American Rifle. Century Co. 1918. p. 266.

The .351 Winchester Self-Loading (.351 SL /.351 WSL) or 8.9x34mmSR is an American rifle cartridge designed in 1906.

== History ==
Winchester introduced the .351 SL in the Winchester Model 1907 self-loading rifle as a replacement for the Winchester Model 1905 and the .35 SL. The .351 SL proved popular with police and security forces as the only chambering available in the model 1907, and was used by France in both world wars.

The 8×35mm cartridge of the Ribeyrolles M1918 was based on the .351 SL. An experimental Thompson submachine gun was also made to fire .351 SL in 1919 but was never produced commercially.

== The modern day ==
While a few gun writers in the 1960s criticized the .351 SL for being inadequate as a deer hunting round, and the round's power has sometimes been compared to a .357 Magnum carbine load, the .351 SL's killing power falls somewhere between the .30-30 Winchester and the .35 Remington. Townsend Whelen praised it as a "good cartridge for deer and similar game in close timber."

Most commercially available loads for the .351 SL launched a 180 grain .351 caliber bullet at between 1,850 and 1,925 fps from a 20-inch barrel, yielding identical muzzle energy to the .30-30 when fired from a 20-inch barrel (rather than a manufacturer's long test barrel). When compared to other medium bore rounds, the .351 SL is closer in power to the .35 Remington (200 grain .358 bullet at 1,950 to 2,000 fps from a 20-inch barrel) than it is to the .357 Magnum carbine (158 grain bullet at about 1,800 fps).

The .351 SL cartridge used an unusual bullet diameter of .351 instead of the .357 or .358 more commonly used in .35-caliber rifle cartridges. Most ammunition available today for the .351 SL is produced by a few boutique manufacturers, often using either cast lead bullets or copper-plated bullets or, occasionally, .358 jacketed bullets resized to .351 or .352 caliber. This ammunition is often loaded to lower velocities in consideration of older firearms which have not been properly maintained, and large differences are seen over the chronograph relative to vintage .351 SL ammunition. But for the handloader who has taken the time to replace the recoil spring and buffer in the Winchester Model 1907, the .351 SL can be loaded to its original velocities. As of 2017, Hawk bullets still makes .351 jacketed expanding bullets with jackets of appropriate thickness.

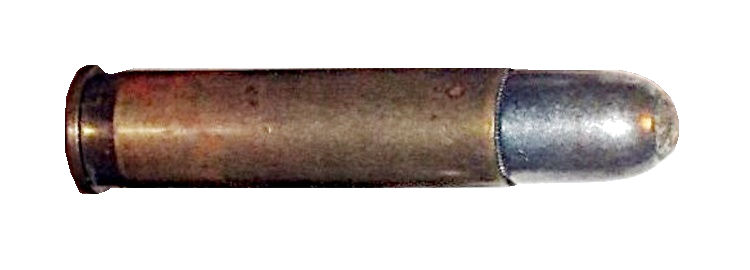
A .351 WSL cartridge.

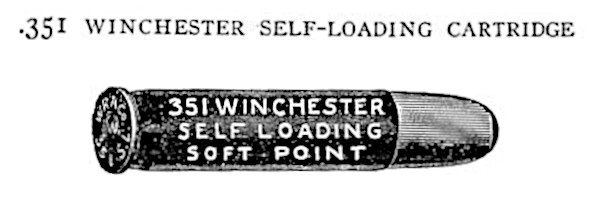
.351 WSL advertised.

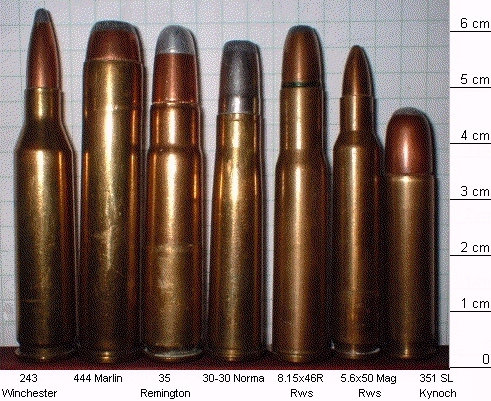
.30-30 Win, .35 Rem, .351 WSL, a.o., sizes.

== See also ==
- List of cartridges by caliber
- List of rifle cartridges
- Table of handgun and rifle cartridges
- 9mm caliber
