= Berlin-Lübecker Maschinenfabrik =

German firearm manufacturer, 1936–1945

- Industry: firearms
- Founded: 1936
- Defunct: 1945
- Fate: Dissolved
- Headquarters: Lübeck, Germany
- Area served: German Army
- Products: weapons, Rifle Scopes, Firearm Components
- Owner: Bernhard Berghaus
- Footnotes; Invented the hammer forged barrel process

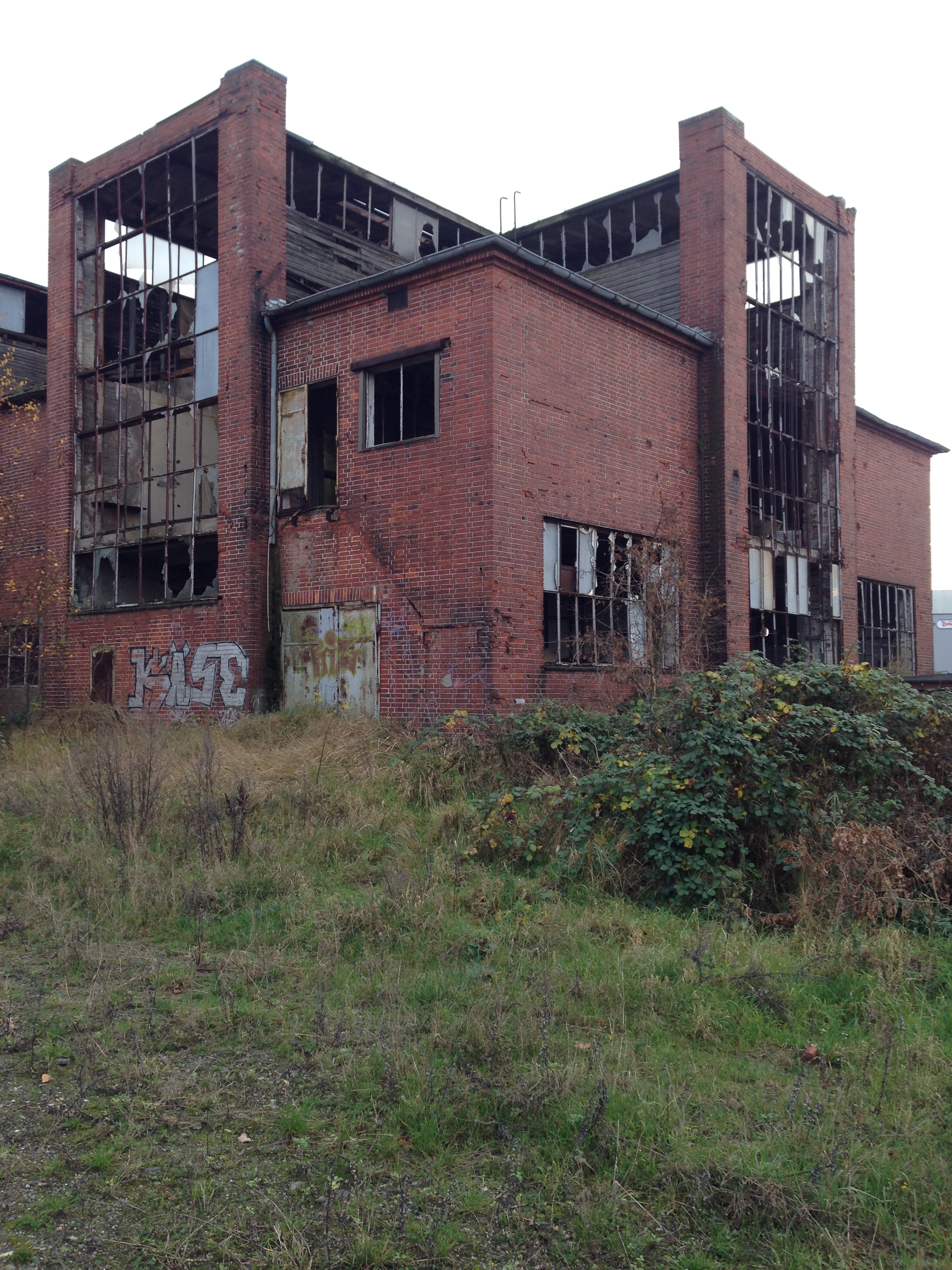
View on the site with ruins from the banks of the river Trave (2014)

Berlin-Lübecker Maschinenfabrik (BLM) was a manufacturer of handguns, infantry rifles, ammunition up to 2 cm, flareguns and precision military equipment in Germany from 1936 to 1945. The company, based in Lübeck, Germany, was one of a number of metal-related businesses owned by Bernhard Berghaus, a German industrialist and member of the Nazi party who played an important role in the rearmament of Germany during the Third Reich.

BLM had a reported labor force of 3,809 in August 1944, comprising 1931 German men, 539 German women, 467 foreign women, 752 foreign men, and 120 war prisoners. The foreign workers were housed in onsite barracks. After the war, Berghaus was sought by the Allies for his participation in using forced labor in his facilities.

The plant, located on Curt-Helms-Str. (today: Glashüttenweg), sat along the eastern bank of the Trave River north of the old City of Lübeck, an island in the Trave River.

== Karabiner 98k Rifle ==
From 1936 to 1942, the company manufactured the Karabiner 98k, the standard service rifle of the German Wehrmacht. The K98k is a bolt-action rifle based on the Mauser M 98 system. As a means of hiding the identity of manufacturers, the German Army required manufacturers to mark their equipment with codes rather than brand names. For the K98k rifles produced by BLM, they were designated with the German Army ordnance codes "S/237", "237" and "duv".

== Gewehr 41 Rifle ==
In 1943, the plant began manufacturing semi-automatic Gewehr 41 rifles. The Walther-designed Gewehr 41 was intended to replace the bolt-action Mauser to allow German infantrymen to offset the advantages of Red Army soldiers equipped with the semi-automatic Tokarev SVT-40 rifle. The Gewehr 41 design proved unsatisfactory in combat and was later replaced by the re-designed Gewehr 43. BLM produced G41 rifles using the "DUV" code with "WaA214" inspection proofs.

== Gewehr 43 Rifle ==
In 1944-45 the company made G/K43 semi-automatic rifles using the ordnance codes "duv" and "qve".

== Scopes and Other Equipment ==
From 1941 to 1944, the company made all the scope mounts for the Zf-41 sniper scope. In 1944-45 it was 1 of 2 only manufacturers to make mounts for the ZF4 sniper scope. From 1936 to 1940, BLM supplied many parts for field armourers using the 'duv' identification code. On a small scale, the company made M1928 flare guns and MG34 bolt parts and barrels.

== Innovation ==
The development department of the Berlin-Lübecker Maschinenfabrik developed a machine for the cold-hammer forging process. This combined forging and flow forming process addressed the need to (mass) produce more durable gun barrels in less time than those produced with traditional methods as some processing steps that would otherwise be necessary, such as tempering or putting in the rifling, can be dispensed with.

Smoothbore (no rifling) Conventional rifling A = land diameter, B = groove diameter Polygonal rifling

The cold-hammer forging process starts with a (short) barrel blank that is already drilled out with a slightly oversized hole. A polished and hardened rifling mandrel rod is fitted to the hammer forging machine's driver, as is the barrel blank (the barrel blank surrounds the mandrel that corresponds to the reverse shape of the barrel including the rifling and if desired the chamber, so that no further work steps are required for cutting or pressing in the rifling). Then, the machine drives the barrel blank and mandrel into the machine, where the barrel passes through four hammers; one on each side. As the hammers strike the slowly rotating barrel, they impart about 140 tons of nominal forging force at a rate of about 1,000 strokes per minute, effectively squishing the barrel blank down onto the mandrel to bring the barrel blank to the intended length and shape and forming the rifling. The rifling can be absent, conventional or polygonal and the mandrel can also include a squeeze bore reverse shape. The compression of the steel molecules created by this immense force also hardens the metal without the application of heat and thus avoids the brittleness that is associated with heating steel to its transformation temperature, hence the term "cold-hammer forging". Since the rifling is formed at the exact same time as the metal is being forged, cold hammer forged barrels are typically known for retaining accuracy for a very long period of time. In fact, it was a process created specifically to extend the life of gun barrels by reducing the effects of wear. Cold-hammer forged machine gun barrels were mass-produced during World War II for the air-cooled MG 42 general-purpose machine gun which very high 1,200 to 1,500 rounds-per-minute cyclic fire rate imparted significant heat stress and wear during rapid firing and thus warranted frequent barrel changes.

== Bombing Raid ==
On August 25, 1944, 81 B-24s of the American Eighth Air Force conducted a bombing raid over Lübeck, heavily damaging the BLM factory and killing or wounding 58 of the facility's workers and air raid personnel.
