= Battle rifle =

Self-loading rifle that fires a full-power rifle cartridge

Examples of battle rifles

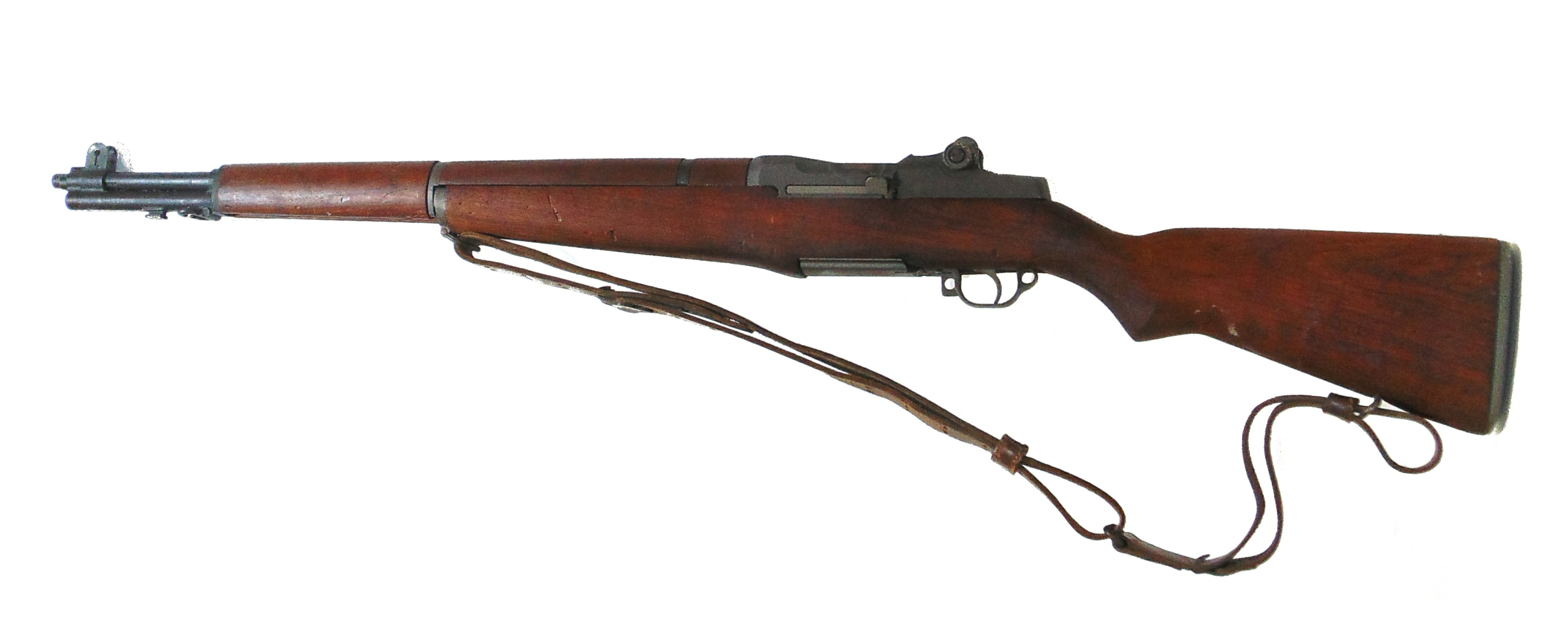
M1 Garand

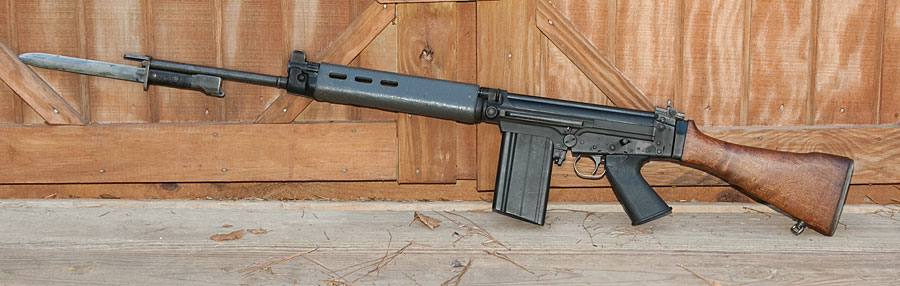
FN FAL

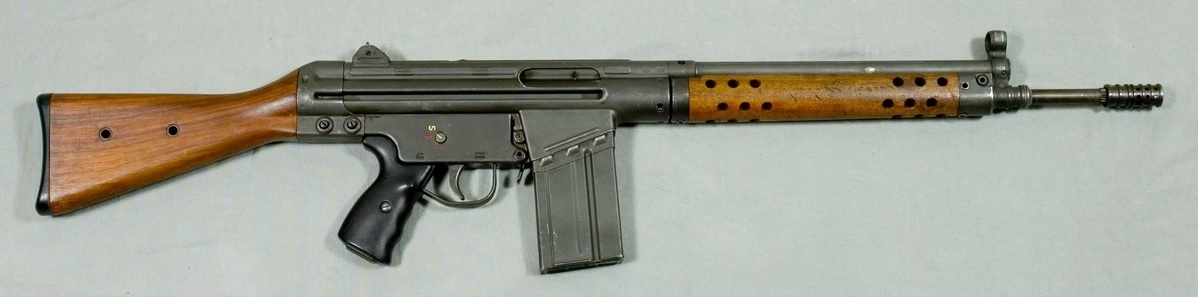
Heckler & Koch G3

A battle rifle is a full-sized service rifle chambered to fire a fully powered cartridge.

The term "battle rifle" is a retronym created largely out of a need to differentiate automatic rifles chambered for fully powered cartridges from automatic rifles chambered for intermediate cartridges, which were later categorized as assault rifles. Battle rifles were most prominent from the 1940s to the 1970s, when they were used as service rifles. While modern battle rifles largely resemble modern assault rifle designs, which replaced battle rifles in most roles, the term may also describe older military full-power semi-automatic rifles such as the M1 Garand, SVT-40, Gewehr 41, Gewehr 43, Type 4, FN Model 1949, and MAS-49.

== History ==
=== World War I ===
==== Semi-automatic ====
First examples of semi-automatic fully powered-cartridge rifles used in World War I are the Meunier A6, Fusil Automatique Modèle 1917 in 8×50mmR Lebel and the Winchester Model 1910 in .401 Winchester Self-Loading.

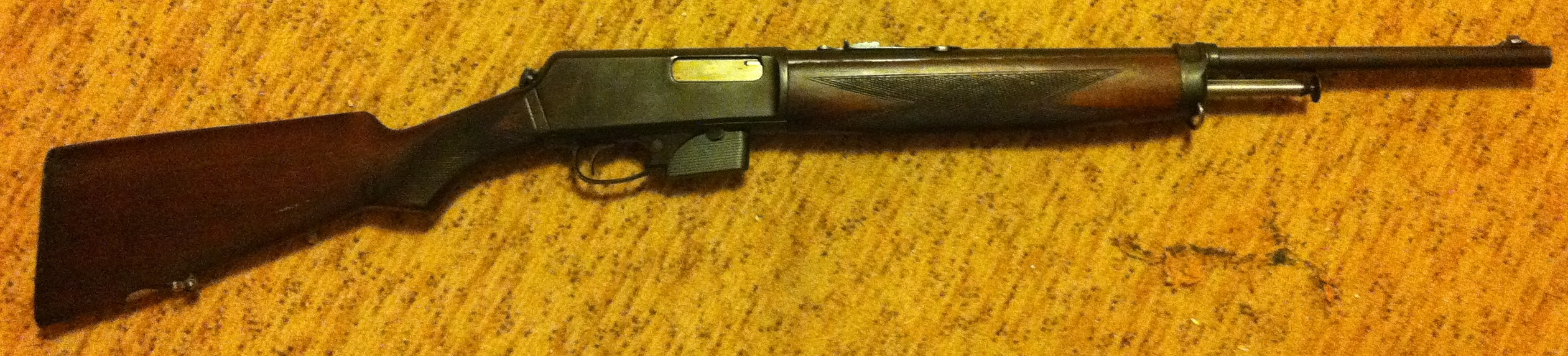
Winchester Model 1910

==== Select fire ====
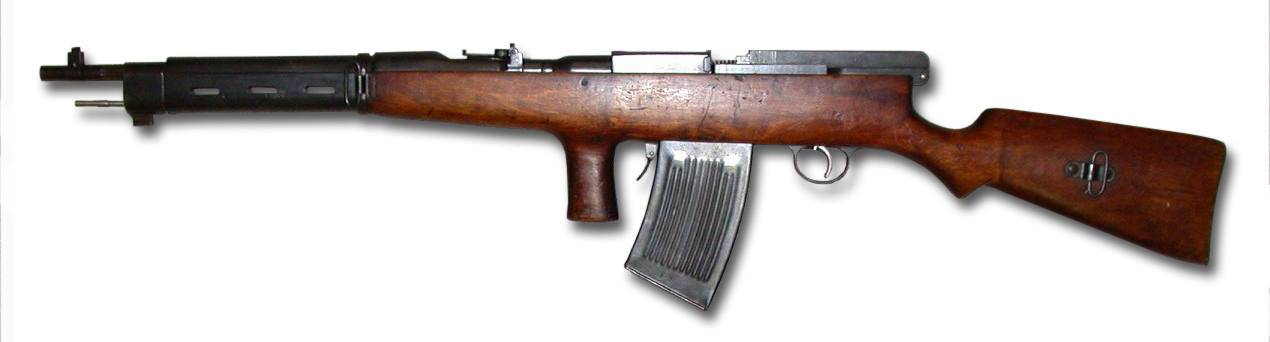
Fedorov Avtomat

During World War I, all of the world's armies were equipped with bolt-action rifles, and the thought of fully automatic fire in a design that was lightweight and controllable enough to be used by a single soldier was seen as something that would be extremely useful in the static conditions of trench warfare. The Russian Empire produced the world's first battle rifle, the Fedorov Avtomat, which was select-fire and fired the rather underpowered 6.5mm Arisaka round from a 25-round box magazine. Only about 100 were produced and used during the war, before the Russian Civil War forced Russia to withdraw its forces in 1917, and so there is an absence of reports on the combat effectiveness of Fedorov rifles, but they continued to be produced until 1925. Fedorov rifles were also used in limited numbers during the opening stages of the Winter War.

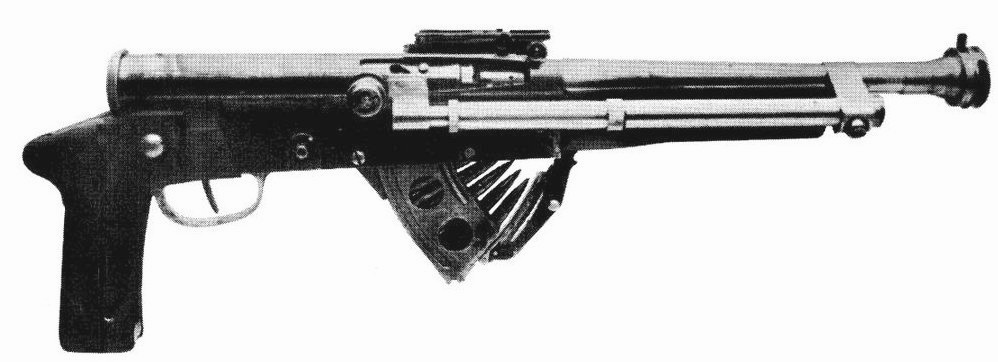
Chauchat-Ribeyrolles 1918

France developed the Chauchat-Ribeyrolles 1918 submachine gun, an automatic shortrifle chambered in 8×50mmR Lebel, intended to defend tank crews.

=== World War II ===
The battle rifle was of major significance during World War II, with the United States, Soviet Union, Nazi Germany, and Imperial Japan all producing them in some capacity. Millions were produced during this era, but overall, with the sole exception of the United States, bolt-action rifles were much more common on the battlefield.

==== M1 Garand ====
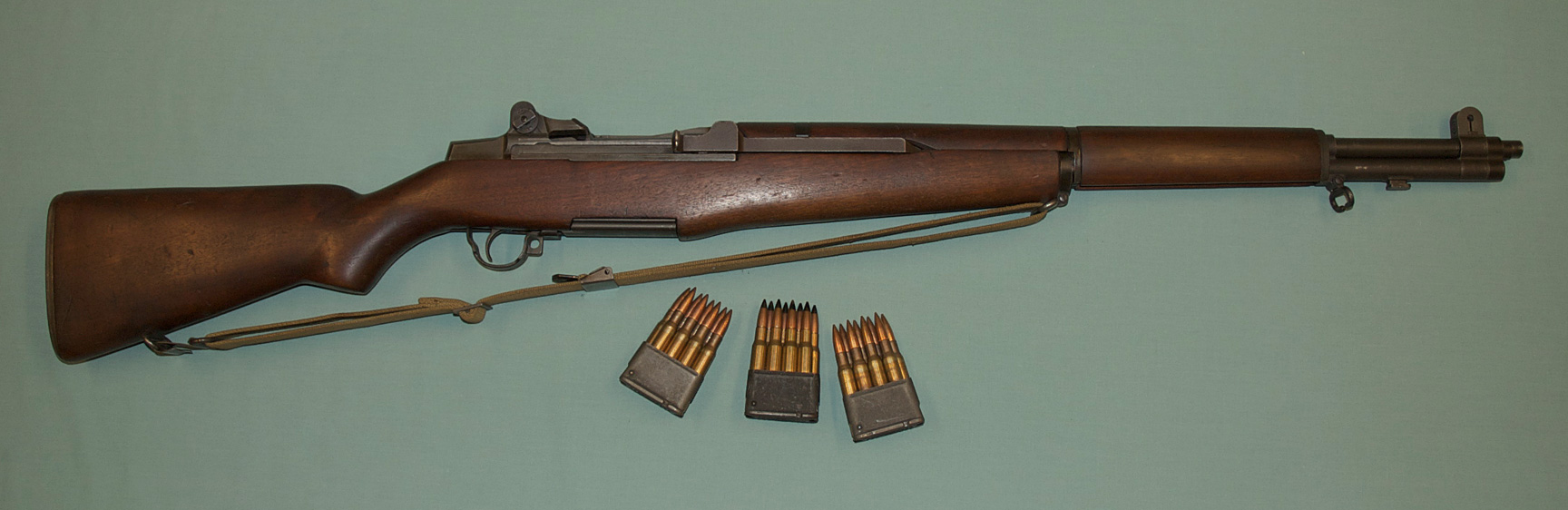
M1 Garand and en-bloc clips

At the outbreak of World War Two, the United States was the only nation in the world to have formally adopted a battle rifle as their service rifle. The M1 Garand fired the .30-06 Springfield cartridge, which loaded from an eight-round en bloc clip. When empty, this clip would eject upwards out of the rifle, making a distinctive ping sound in the process, after which a new en bloc clip could be inserted into the rifle. The adoption of the semi-automatic rifle allowed American riflemen to field much greater sustained firepower than their Allied and Axis contemporaries, who were still using bolt-action rifles as their primary rifle. The Garand continued to see front line service during the Korean War, saw limited service during the Vietnam War, and served as the basis for the creation of the M14 rifle.

==== SVT-40 ====
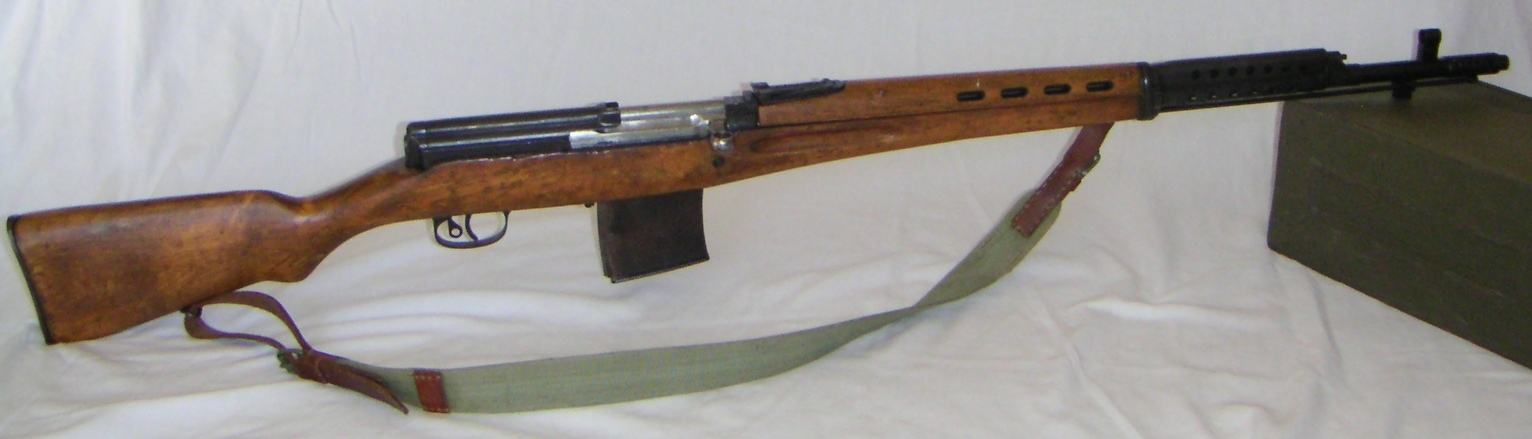
SVT-40

The Soviet Union issued one major battle rifle, the SVT-40, which was invented by Fedor Tokarev, who is also well known for creating the Tokarev pistol. It uses the 7.62×54mmR cartridge, and reloaded with a 10-round magazine, but the receiver was open-top, meaning it could also be loaded with 5-round stripper clips, the same ones used in the Mosin-Nagant. The SVT's performance was overall unsatisfactory, owing largely to its lack of reliability, in particular that it needed frequent cleaning, and the stock was of a poor quality. Nonetheless, over 1 million rifles were produced, and it continued to see service until the end of the war. Like the Mosin-Nagant, it was replaced by the AK-47 shortly after World War II. A select fire variant named the AVT-40 was also produced in limited numbers where regular machine guns such as the DP-27 were not available, but the weapon's 10 round capacity made it somewhat unsuitable for fully automatic fire.

==== FG-42 ====
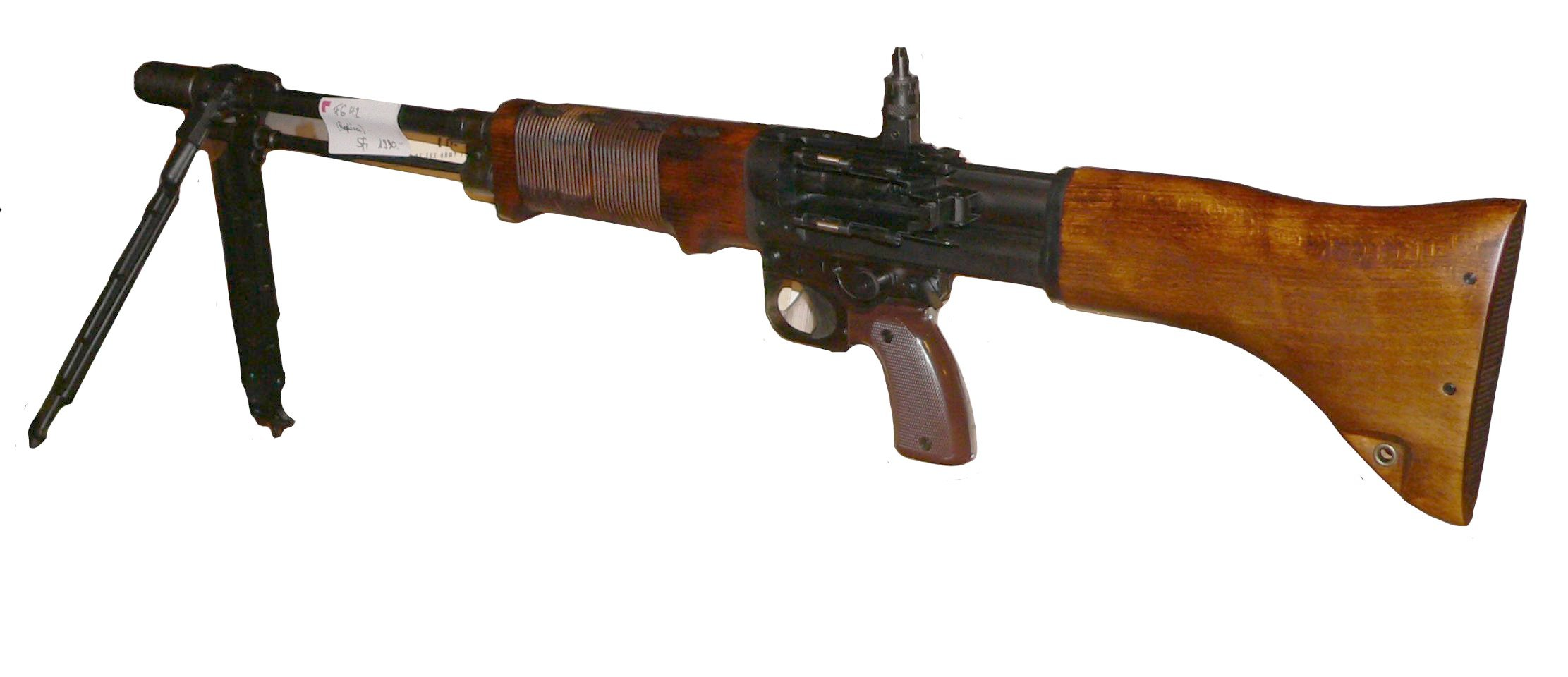
FG-42 with bipod deployed.

Nazi Germany was responsible for a large amount of experimental weaponry during the war. Among these was the FG-42, a rifle built specifically for the Fallschirmjäger (paratroopers). The rifle was meant to be a jack-of-all-trades that would be used during the first stages of an airborne operation, before heavier weapons like the MG-42 could be sent in. The FG-42 was a select fire rifle, which had a 20-round magazine that loaded on the left of the rifle, and it used the 7.92×57mm Mauser cartridge. It was first used during the Battle of Rhodes (1943), and continued to see limited service until the end of the war, with a total of about 7,000 produced. Postwar observers were very impressed by the rifle, and its design heavily influenced the British EM-2 rifle and the American M60 Machine Gun, which was standard issue in the U.S. during the Vietnam War.

==== Gewehr 41 and 43 ====
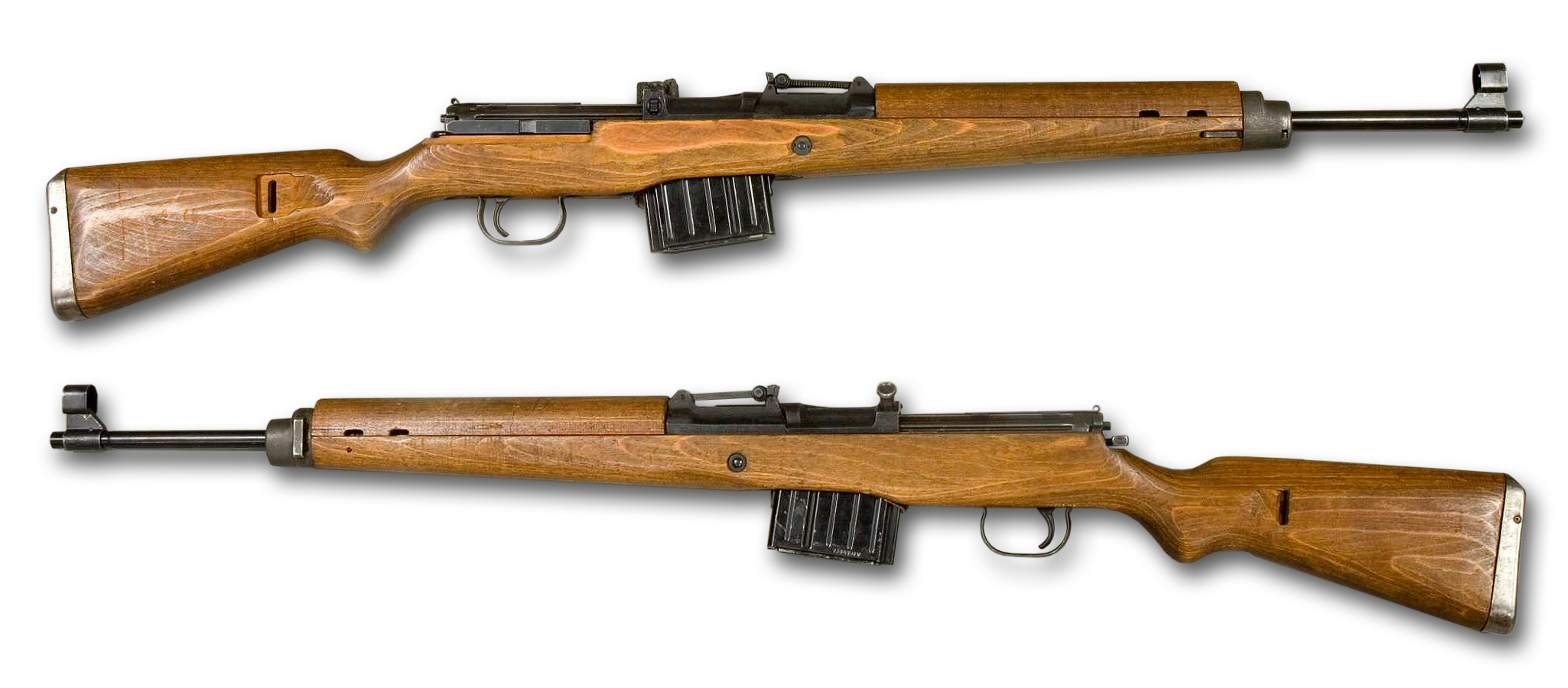
Gewehr 43

Another German design built during the Second World War was the Gewehr 41, which was produced by Walther Arms and Mauser, and had a 10-round internal magazine, loaded with 2 stripper clips and used the 7.92×57mm Mauser cartridge. About 145,000 were produced before the Mauser design was worked upon and made into the Gewehr 43. Externally, the two rifles look mostly identical, and the main difference that sets them apart is that the G43 reloads with external box magazines (10 rounds), and has a short-stroke piston, whereas the G41 uses the same system as that in the M1922 Bang rifle. Over 400,000 G43s were built.

==== Type 4 ====
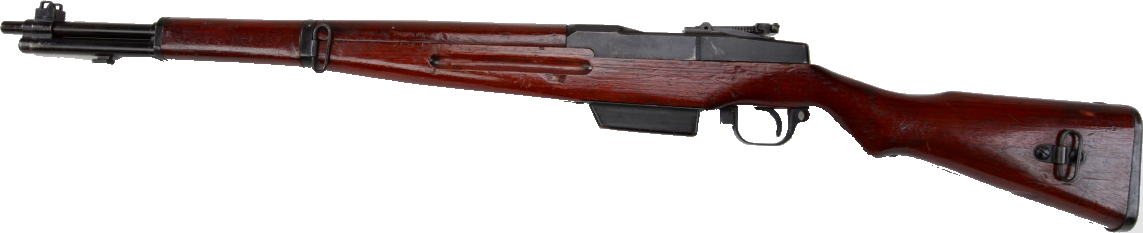
Type 4

During the Pacific War, the Empire of Japan created the Type 4 rifle, also known as the Type 5, to act as a counter to the American M1 Garand. While initial attempts were made as rudimentary copies of the Garand, it was found that the Japanese 7.7×58mm Arisaka cartridge didn't respond well to being fitted into the Garand's internals, and so, the en-bloc clip design of the Garand was replaced with a 10-round internal magazine, loaded with stripper clips, as was seen in the German Gewehr 41. Only 250 were built, in 1945, when the Imperial Japanese Army was already at its breaking point, and production ceased with the surrender in August of that year.

=== Cold War ===
==== FN FAL ====
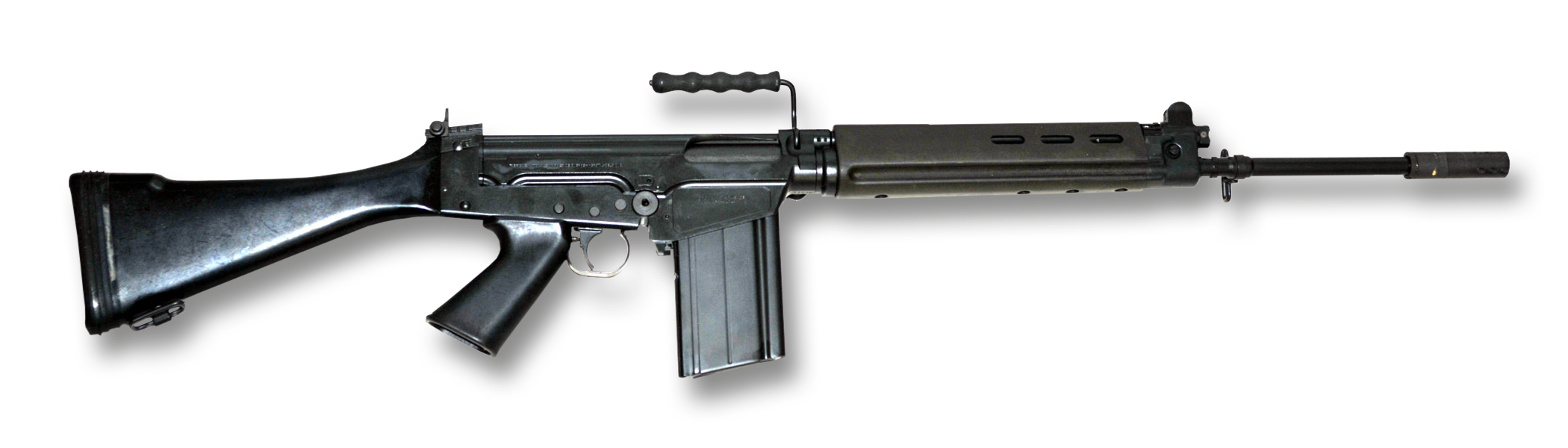
FN FAL

The most enduring battle rifle of the Cold War is the FN FAL (Fusil Automatique Léger). The FAL is a rifle produced by Belgian company FN Herstal, firing 7.62×51mm NATO from 20 or 30 round box magazines. It was first produced in 1953, at which point all the nations of the Warsaw Pact except Czechoslovakia (which first used its own vz. 52 rifle before switching to the vz. 58 model), were all equipping with the AK-47, or some variant of it, but most NATO countries had their own, domestically produced designs. For instance, the United Kingdom used the Lee-Enfield, the United States used the M1 Garand, and France used the MAS-49. The FAL was supposed to solve this issue; however, the United States chose not to adopt it, primarily because their own design, the M14 rifle, was a pound lighter, less internally complex, and there was financial benefit for the United States in producing it domestically. At the time of its creation, it was adopted by several NATO countries, including Belgium, Luxembourg, the Netherlands, among many others. The United Kingdom manufactured their own version of the FAL, the L1A1 Self-Loading Rifle, which is semi-automatic only. Though assault rifles are typically more common in contemporary usage, the FAL is still in active service in many nations (none of which are in NATO), most notably Brazil. In total, the FAL has been used by over 90 countries and over 7,000,000 have been produced, leading to the rifle's other, unofficial name: "The Right Arm of the Free World."

==== Heckler & Koch G3 ====
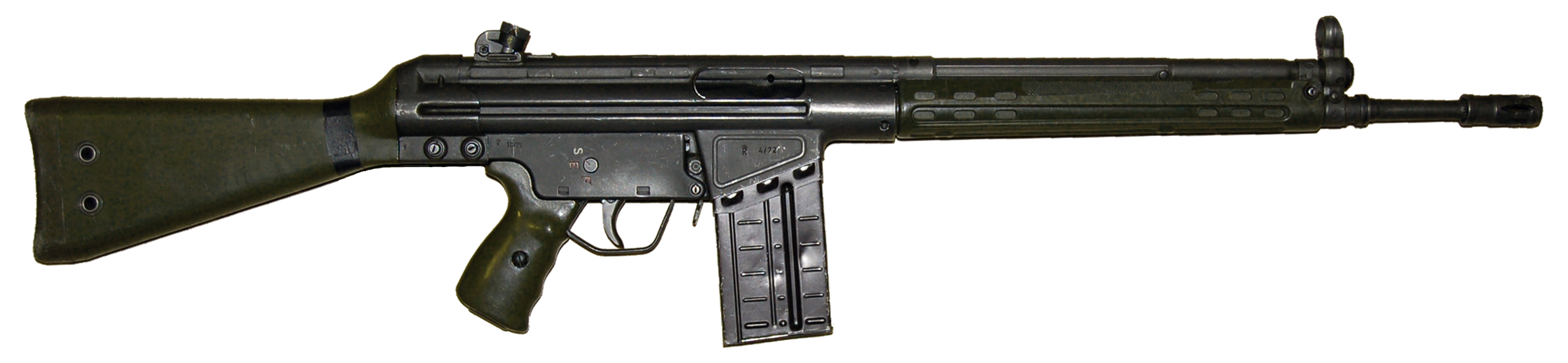
Heckler & Koch G3

The Heckler & Koch G3 (Gewehr 3) is a roller-delayed blowback operating system rifle developed in the 1950s by the German armament manufacturer Heckler & Koch (H&K) in collaboration with the Spanish state-owned design and development agency CETME (Centro de Estudios Técnicos de Materiales Especiales), firing 7.62×51mm NATO from 5, 10, 20, 30, or 40 round detachable box magazines and 50 or 100 round detachable drum magazines. It was first produced in 1959. The modular designed G3 has over the years been exported to over 70 countries and manufactured under licence in at least 15 countries, bringing the total number built to around 7,800,000.

==== M14 ====
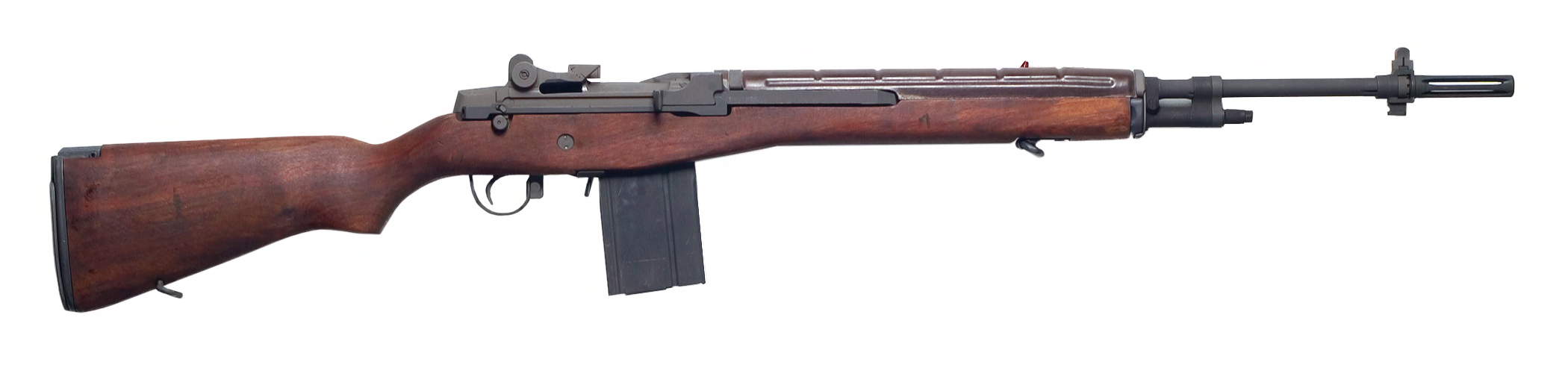
M14

The M14 rifle is an American design, made to replace the M1 Garand, which was used as the basis for the M14. It is a select fire weapon, firing 7.62×51mm NATO from 20-round detachable box magazines. It was the primary infantry rifle at the start of the Vietnam War, but once deployed into combat, there were complaints about the weapon's performance, such as it was too difficult to control in full auto, its profile was too long, and the weapon was generally unreliable. A 1962 Department of Defense report described it as "completely inferior" to the M1 Garand. It went into production in 1959 and about 1,300,000 M14 rifles have been produced. The M14 was eventually replaced by the M16 assault rifle, which was a controversial decision as the M16's less powerful 5.56×45mm NATO cartridge, combined with the fact it was much smaller and lighter, and had plastic furniture instead of wood, led some soldiers to sarcastically call the new rifle the 'Mattel 16'. Despite initial shortcomings, however, the M16 remains in American military service to this day, and it is the most produced rifle in 5.56×45mm NATO cartridge.

==== AR-10 ====
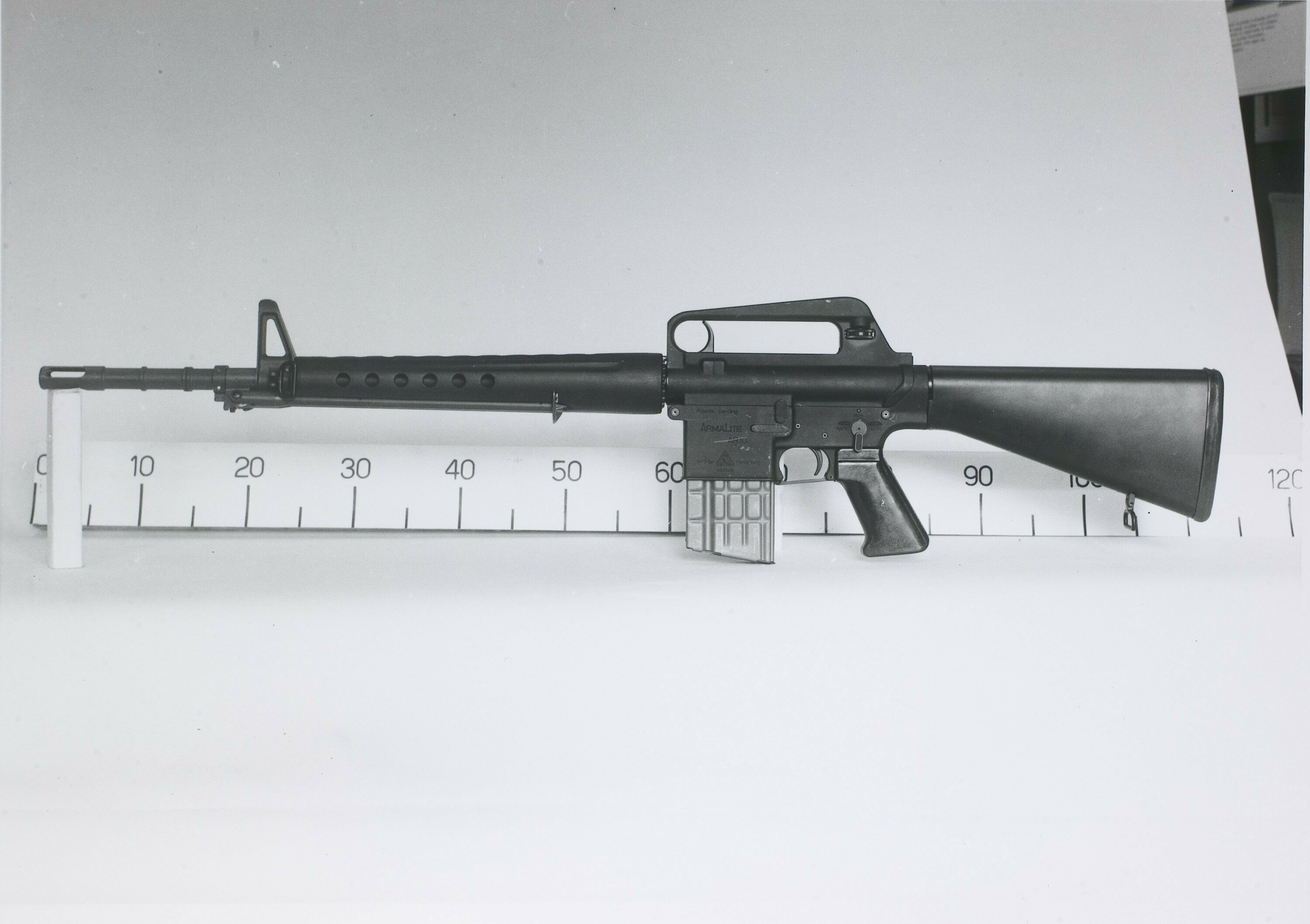
Artillerie Inrichtingen (A.I.) produced AR-10

The ArmaLite AR-10 is a 7.62×51mm NATO battle rifle designed by Eugene Stoner in 1955, as a late entrant to the United States Army's Light Rifle Trials to replace the M1 Garand in US service. It was initially manufactured by ArmaLite (then a division of the Fairchild Aircraft Corporation) and under a manufacturing license by Artillerie Inrichtingen. First introduced in 1956, the AR-10 used an innovative combination of a straight-line barrel/stock design with phenolic composite, a new U.S. patent 2,951,424 filed gas-operated bolt and carrier system and forged alloy parts resulting in a small arm significantly easier to control in automatic fire and over 1 lb (0.45 kg) lighter than other infantry rifles of the day. Over its production life, the original AR-10 was built in relatively small numbers, with fewer than 10,000 rifles assembled. However, the ArmaLite AR-10 (later developed into the ArmaLite AR-15, M16 rifle, and M4 carbine) would become the progenitor for a wide range of firearms.

=== Contemporary usage ===
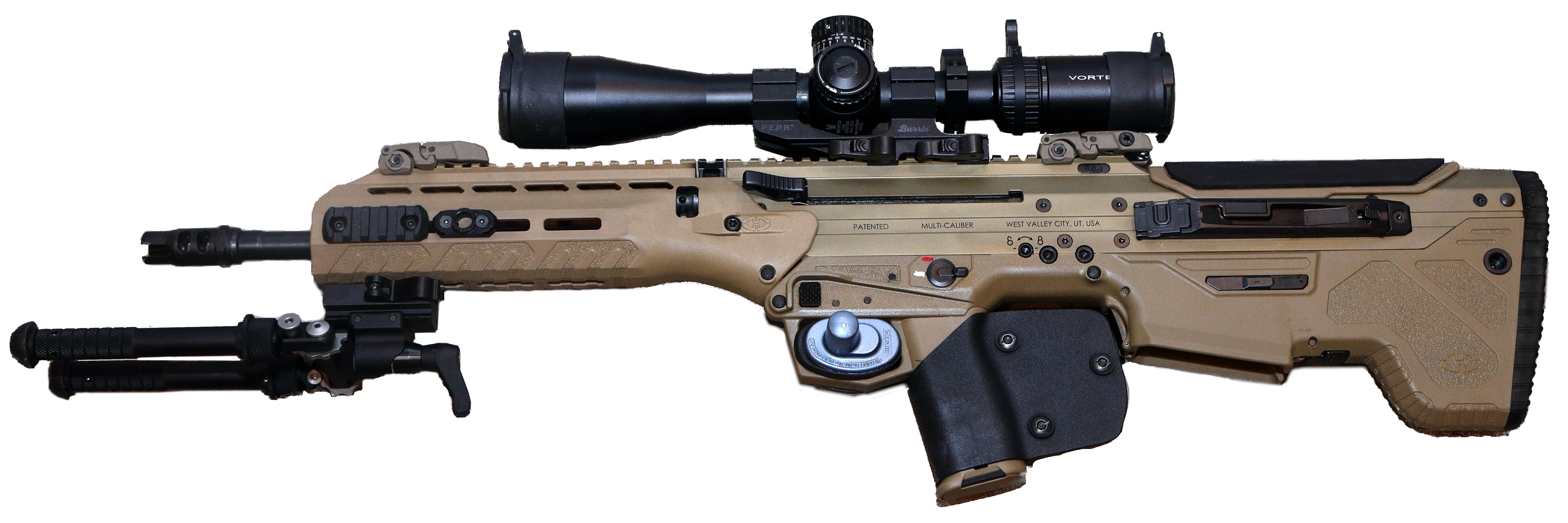
Desert Tech MDRX

After WW2, the USSR was the first global power to make an assault rifle the standard infantry weapon, with the AK-47 family of firearms. After the United States formally adopted the M16 rifle in the 1960s, nearly every other nation adopted the assault rifle paradigm over the following decades. Because they were more controllable, much lighter, and still offered acceptable levels of penetration, intermediate cartridges were considered a better choice, and gradually battle rifles began to be replaced with weapons such as the Steyr AUG, Heckler & Koch G36, FAMAS, and SA80. However, battle rifles do continue to be used in certain roles where the extra power is appreciated, for example, designated marksmen in the Bundeswehr use the HK417. Other examples of contemporary battle rifles include the SCAR-H, Mk 14 Enhanced Battle Rifle, Desert Tech MDRx, IWI Tavor 7, and XM7 rifle.

Australian soldier with a HK417 in Afghanistan.

== See also ==
- Assault rifle
- Automatic rifle
- Designated marksman rifle
- Fully powered cartridge
- Light machine gun
- List of firearms
- Sniper rifle
- 7.62×51mm NATO
- .30-06 Springfield
- 7.62×54mmR
- 7.92×57mm Mauser
- 6.5×50mmSR Arisaka
- .277 Fury
