= Puteaux machine gun =

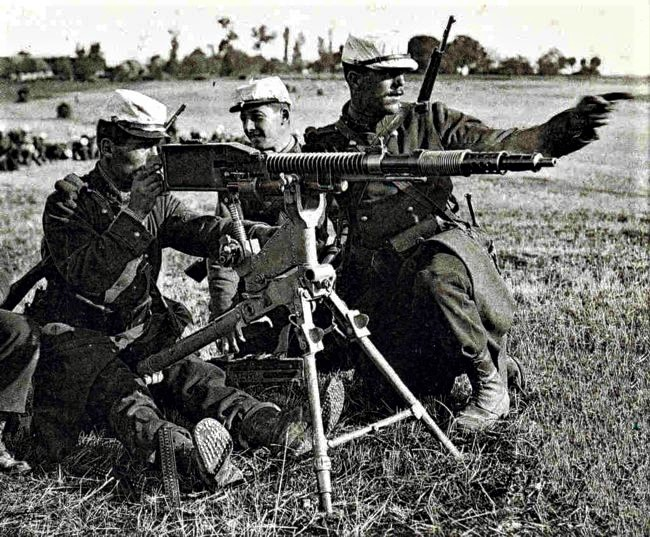
French soldiers firing the Puteaux Mle.1905 machine gun on maneuvers

The Puteaux Model 1905 machine gun was an early attempt to create a feasible machine gun for the French Army. Designed by officers at the Atelier de Construction de Puteaux (APX), it was a gas operated, air-cooled, full automatic weapon that fired from an open bolt.

== Design ==
With an adjustable firing rate of thirty to six hundred rounds per minute, the Puteaux fired the 8mm Lebel round, the same used in the Hotchkiss M1914 machine gun (Mle 1900). The feed system consisted of several metal strips of ammunition fed in, also the same as the Hotchkiss, but with several modifications.

The similarities with the Hotckiss end there. The Puteaux used a Bang-type gas action, with a sliding cup placed around the muzzle which is blown forward by the muzzle blast to operate the action through a linkage which connects the muzzle cup to a bolt locking / unlocking system. This system proved to be complicated and unreliable compared to the contemporary Hotchkiss machine guns. Very few M1905s were delivered, and it was scarcely used in battle.

The gun's performance was a disappointment. It was immediately redesigned as the St. Étienne Mle 1907 machine gun, which only provided a marginal improvement.
