= ZF41 =

Firearm optical sight

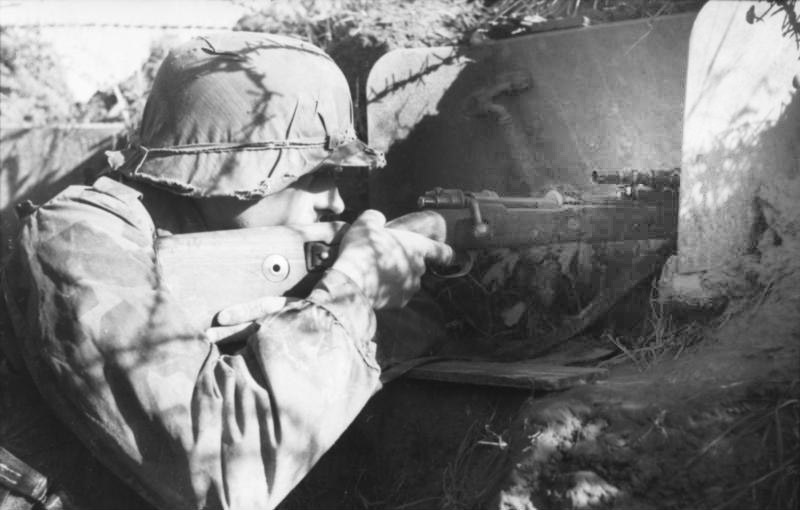
A Luftwaffe Field Division sniper aims through a ZF41 scope on his Karabiner 98k rifle

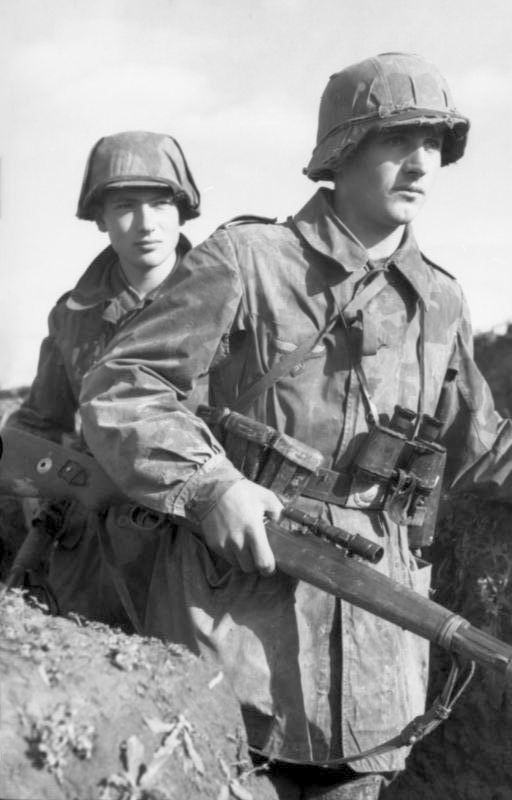
Luftwaffe Field Divisions soldier with Karabiner 98K and mounted ZF41 in Russia 1942

The ZF41 German: Zielfernrohr (Rifle Scope) was an optical sight produced in Germany during the Second World War.

== History ==
Starting from 1941, the short 1.5× Zielfernrohr 41 (ZF41) telescopic sight was fitted to some Karabiner 98k rifles for designated marksman use. The ZF41 was the first attempt to provide the ordinary infantryman with a rifle capable of being used, if not for pure sniping, then at least for sharpshooting. It was initially planned to equip most combat units with the ZF41 scopes, but only 6% of German weapons production could fit the sight.

Though useful for sharpshooting with normal infantry units, the design was generally rejected by sniper schools and disliked by snipers, because the 1.5x magnifying scope was deemed insufficient for shooting effectively at point targets over long distances. Problems were the scope's extreme eye relief, poor functioning in bad light and low magnifying power. Nonetheless, lack of better telescopic sights meant the ZF39 was used by snipers at the early stages of the war in the Eastern Front, but many snipers preferred captured Soviet rifles and custom-equipped German rifles with civilian scopes such as the vintage Gewehr 98.

By the end of the war in 1945, more than 100,000 ZF41 scopes had been produced, the largest production of German optical sights during the war. Approximately 3,000 were marked ZF40, 29,000 were marked ZF41 (ZF40 and ZF41 later had this etched out and ZF41/1 added when they came back for service or repair) and the rest designated ZF41/1.

== Use on other rifles ==
The G-41(m) and G-41(w) semi-automatic rifles had ZF40 scopes added in small quantities for test and evaluation in the field. MP-43, MP-44, FG-42 automatic select fire weapons had the ZF41/1 fitted for test only, these were not produced past prototype stage, the ZF4 scope was then used on these weapons instead.

The Germans also produced a small amount of prototype and pre-production test batch of the G33/40 equipped with the ZF41. These were photographed for inclusion in the ZF41 manual in 1942. However the Brno factory switched over to the Karabiner 98k in 1943. Approximately 350 to 400 scoped G33/40 rifles were made in total. As of 2013 only one has been examined and found to be a real test batch scoped rifle: it is a late dot 1942 production rifle with serial number 3962C.

At least one American M1A1 Carbine was known to have been modified to accept a captured ZF41 optic. The rifle is in the collection of the Imperial War Museum in London.

== Other scope sights from the same era ==
- ZF39, German 4×36 telescopic sight
- ZF4, German telescopic sight with 4 times magnification
- PU, Soviet 3.5×21 telescopic sight
- M81, M82 and M84, American sights used on Garand (M1D, M1C) and 1903A4
