= St. Étienne Mle 1907 =

St. Étienne M1907
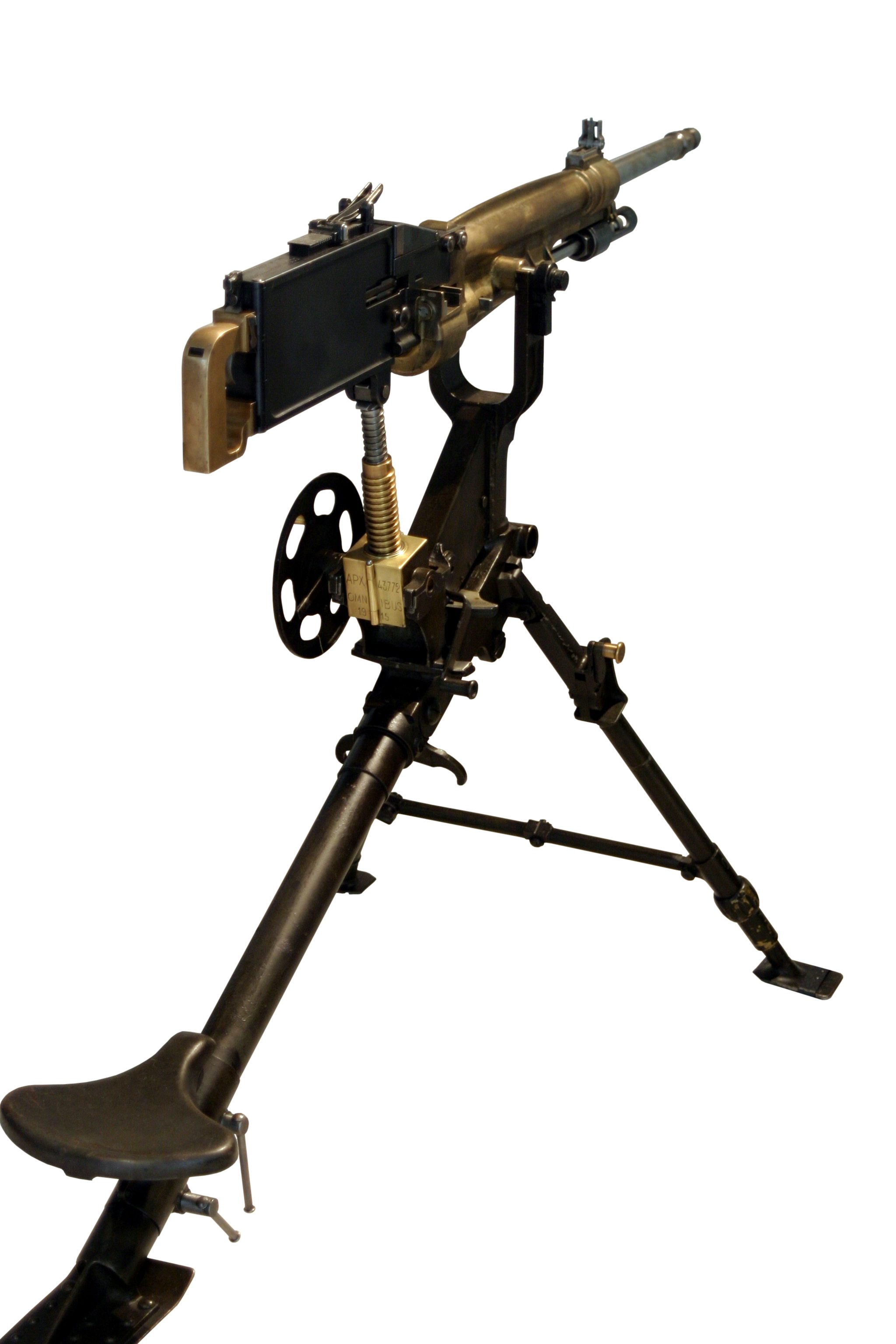
- Type: Heavy machine gun
- Place of origin: France

Service history
- Used by: See Users
- Wars: Italo-Turkish War; World War I; Greco-Turkish War (1919–1922); Warlord Era; Spanish Civil War; World War II

Production history
- Manufacturer: Manufacture d'Armes de Saint-Etienne (MAS).
- Produced: 1907–1916
- No. built: 39,700
- Variants: Puteaux Mle 1905; Mle 1907; Transformée 1916

Specifications
- Mass: 26 kg (57 lb 5 oz)
- Length: 1180 mm
- Barrel length: 710 mm
- Cartridge: 8mm Lebel
- Caliber: 8 mm
- Action: Gas-operated
- Rate of fire: adjustable: 8 to 600 round/min
- Muzzle velocity: 724 m/s (2,375 ft/s)
- Feed system: 25-round metal strips or 300-round fabric belts (1916)

The French St. Étienne Mle 1907 (French: Mitrailleuse Mle 1907 T) was a controversial gas operated air-cooled machine gun in 8mm Lebel which was widely used only in the early years of the First World War. For "political reasons", the St.Etienne Mle 1907 was developed not to derive from the patented Hotchkiss machine gun. Instead, to avoid patent infringement and royalties, it borrowed its gas operated, blow-forward design from the semi-automatic Bang rifle of 1903. The Bang system, first transposed by 1905 to the French Puteaux APX Machine Gun, had proved unsatisfactory enough to inspire its redesign by 1907 as the St-Étienne machine gun. However the Mle 1907 St-Étienne was only a partial redesign: the original blow-forward gas piston, rack-and-pinion system, and bolt mechanism of the Mle 1905 Puteaux machine gun had all been kept only slightly modified inside the newer weapon. Eventually a total of over 39,700 St-Étienne Mle 1907 machine guns were manufactured between 1908 and late 1917. They were widely used by French infantry only during the early part of World War I until their replacement by the more reliable Hotchkiss M1914 machine gun.

== History ==
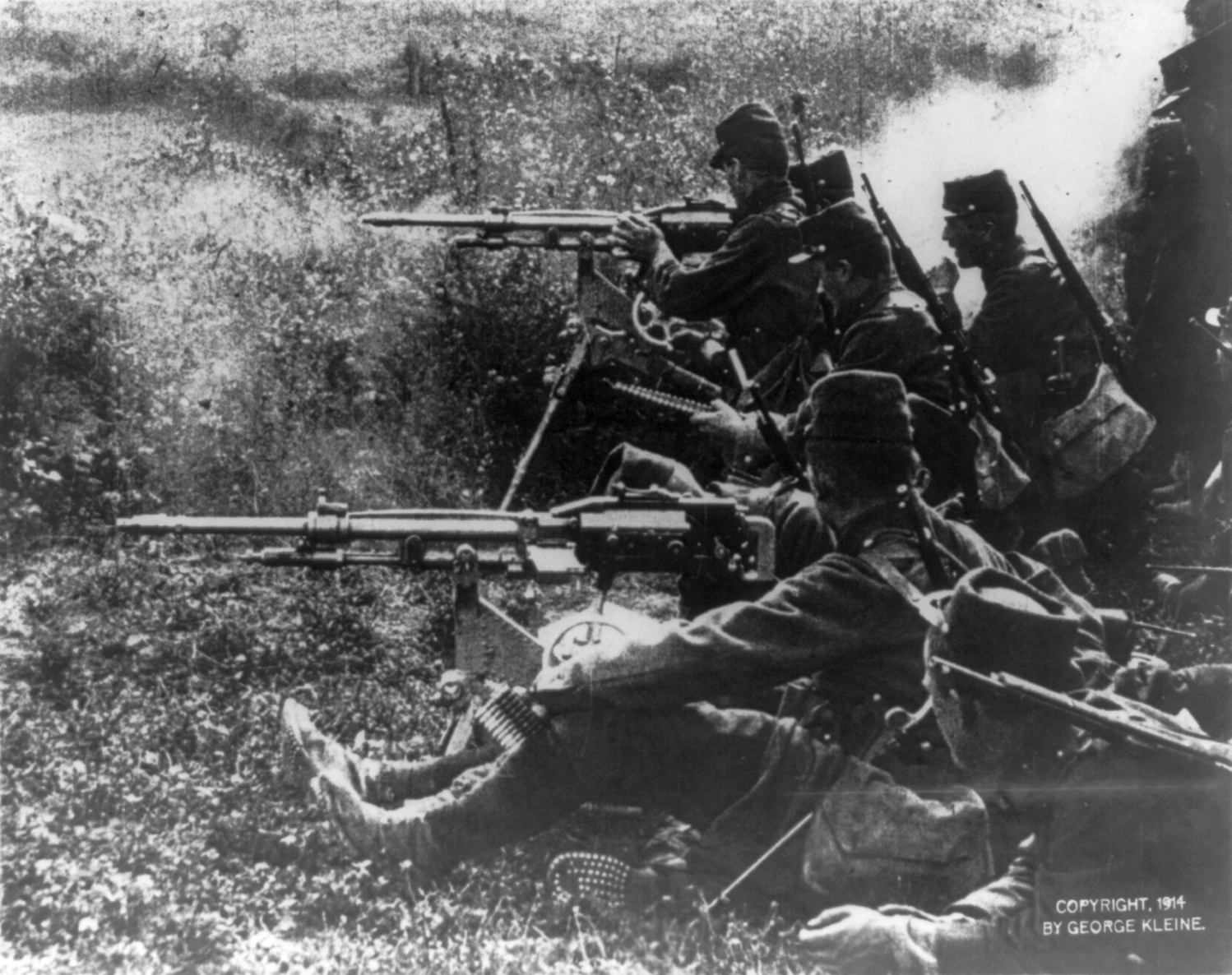
The Mle 1907 was used extensively by French units during the early stages of the first world war.

Around the turn of the century the French military evaluated machine guns made by the private French firm of Hotchkiss et Cie. While the tests were technically convincing, following which Hotchkiss machine-guns were purchased for French alpine and colonial troops, it was decided for political reasons that a machine gun for French line infantry had to originate from state-owned arms manufacturers. A first attempt by a French government arsenal near Paris (APX) was the Puteaux M1905 machine gun inspired by the first gas actuated blow forward Bang rifle system of 1903. It was a deliberate attempt to develop an infantry machine gun that would be mechanically different from the patented Hotchkiss Mle 1900 machine gun design. However, the M1905 Puteaux machine gun soon proved to be unsatisfactory. Consequently, the national arsenal at Saint-Étienne (MAS) thoroughly reworked and modified the Puteaux machine gun resulting in some measure of improvement but also increased complexity—64 component parts for the St-Étienne Mle 1907 vs. only 32 parts for the Hotchkiss Mle 1914. Barrel changes on the Mle 1907 St-Étienne were much easier than on the M1905 Puteaux and its firing rate could be set at any point between eight rounds per minute and about 600 rounds per minute. Either metal strips different from those used on the Hotchkiss machine gun or else fabric belts, the latter introduced in 1916, for the 8mm Lebel ammunition could be used.

George Chinn notes about the 1907 model that:

While it was gas actuated by means of a piston, the French reversed the conventional principle. Instead of the piston thrust rearward furnishing the source of energy to operate the piece, the gas propels the piston forward to unlock the bolt. The piston is attached by a spring-loaded rod to a gear rack. This in turn engages a spur gear which is fastened to an actuating lever. When the lever is in the forward horizontal position and engages a cam slot in the bolt, the gun is locked. Upon firing, the gas drives the piston forward, compressing the spring and causing the spur gear to rotate clockwise. The actuating lever turns with the gear for a half revolution, retracting the bolt and stopping at the rear horizontal position. The driving spring then forces the piston rearward, which reverses the action and returns the bolt to battery.

Nevertheless, in the muddy environment of trench warfare the mechanically complex St-Étienne Mle 1907 suffered from frequent stoppages and was difficult to maintain by front-line soldiers. A quotation from a French post-war military evaluation describes it as an "admirable weapon, patented clockwork, but very delicate and sparing its whims only for machine-gun virtuosos". In July 1917 the Mle 1907 St-Étienne was gradually withdrawn from front line service and replaced by the distinctly simpler and more reliable Hotchkiss M1914 machine gun. Large numbers of the M1907 St-Étienne machine gun were then transferred to military units in the rear, to the French colonies, and to the Italian Army. Many also ended up in the Greek Army during the 1920s. Altogether 39,700 Mle 1907 St-Étienne machine guns had been manufactured when the decision to close down their last assembly line was taken in November 1917. The Mle 1907-T was still in service at the beginning of World War II, for instance with second-line units.

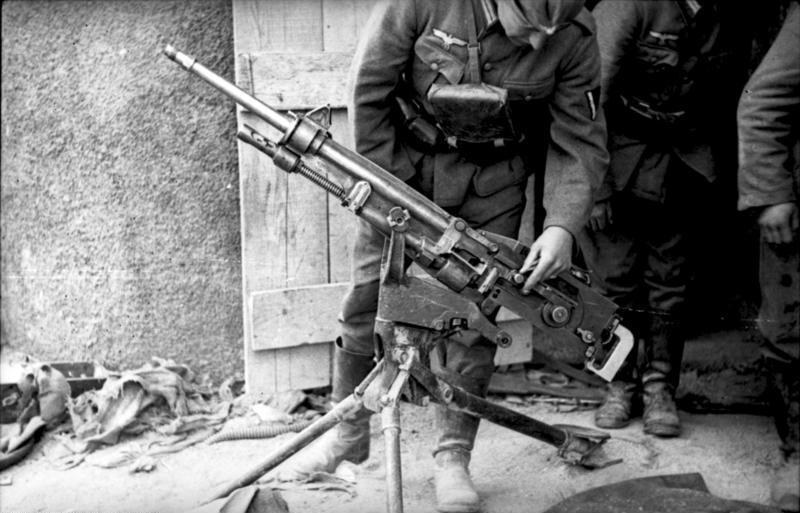
German soldier examining a captured St. Étienne Mle 07 in May 1940

Romania contracted 500 machine guns from France in July 1916; 268 were delivered until August when the war started on the Romanian front.

== Users ==
- France
- Greece: supplied during World War I. Also used during the Greco-Turkish War and the Greco-Italian War.
- Italy
- Romania
- Spanish Republic
- United States: used as an anti-aircraft weapon by the American Expeditionary Forces
- China
