= Gewehr 43 =

German semi-automatic rifle

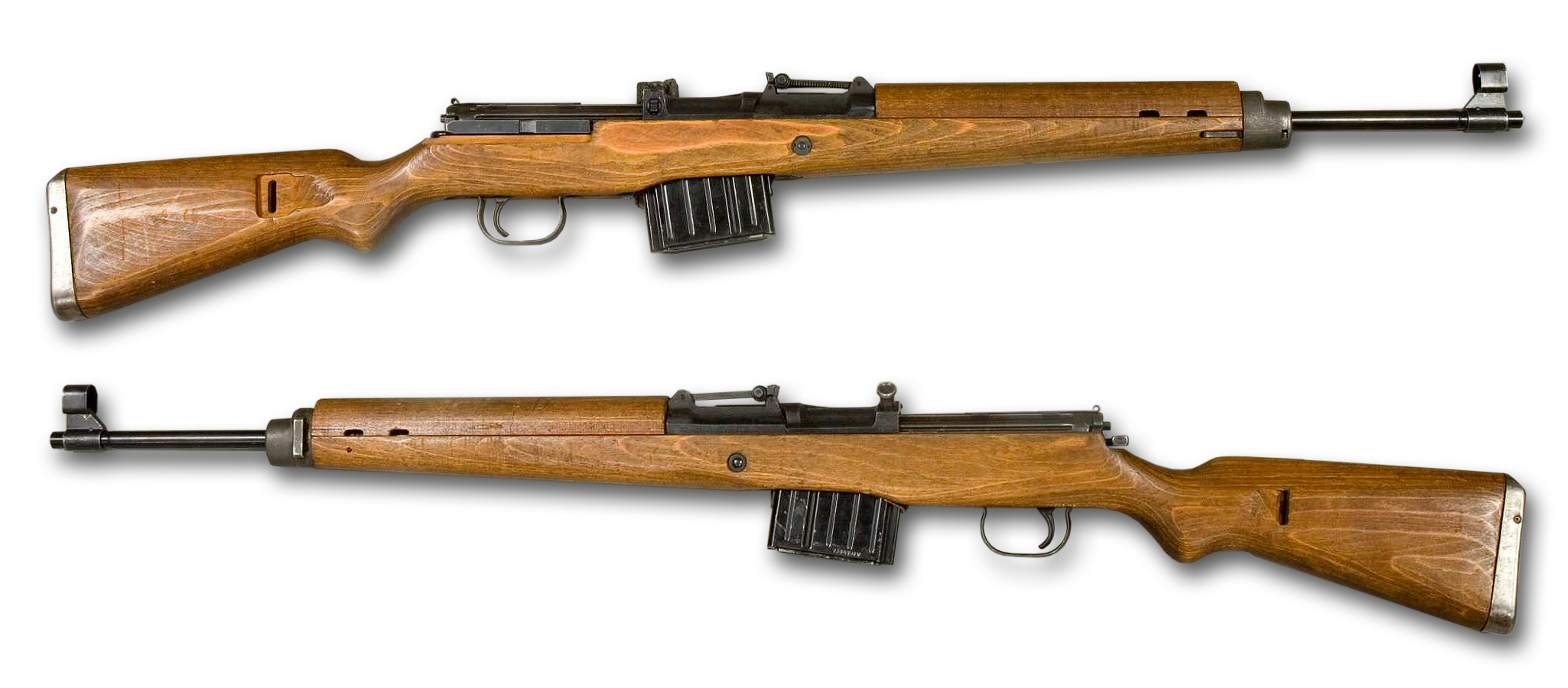
- Gewehr 43 from the collections of the Swedish Army Museum
- Type: Semi-automatic rifle
- Place of origin: Nazi Germany

Service history
- In service: 1943–1945 (Wehrmacht service)
- Used by: See Users
- Wars: World War II; First Indochina War

Production history
- Designer: Carl Walther
- Designed: 1943
- Produced: 1943–1945
- No. built: 402,713

Specifications
- Mass: 4.4 kg (9.7 lb)
- Length: 1,115 mm (43.9 in)
- Barrel length: 550 mm (21.7 in)
- Cartridge: 7.92×57mm Mauser
- Action: Gas-operated short-stroke piston, flapper locking
- Muzzle velocity: 746–776 m/s (2,448–2,546 ft/s)
- Effective firing range: 500 m, 800 m with scope
- Feed system: 10-round detachable box magazine or 5-round stripper clips
- Sights: Iron sights, ZF 43 optical crosshair sight

The Gewehr 43 or Karabiner 43 (abbreviated G43, K43, Gew 43, Kar 43) is a 7.92×57mm Mauser caliber semi-automatic rifle developed by Germany during World War II. The design was based on that of the earlier G41(W) but incorporated an improved short-stroke piston gas system as well as a detachable magazine and relocated charging handle.

== History ==
Germany's quest for a semi-automatic infantry rifle resulted in two designs – the G41(M) and G41(W), from Mauser and Walther Arms respectively. The Mauser design was introduced in 1941 and at least 12,755 were made, but it proved unreliable in combat. The Walther design fared better in combat but still suffered from reliability problems. The problems with both designs stemmed from a demand made by the Army that the rifles would not use holes drilled into the barrel, known as gas ports, to run the automatic loading mechanism. Meeting this requirement meant the designs had to use uncommon mechanisms that were simply unreliable and highly prone to fouling.

The German invasion of the Soviet Union led to small numbers of the SVT-40 being captured and returned to Germany for examination. These used a simple gas mechanism powered from a port cut into the barrel about 1/3 of the way back from the end and replaced the conventional stripper reloads with a modern box magazine. It was clearly superior to the G41, and simpler as well. In 1943, Walther combined a similar gas system with aspects of the G41(W) providing greatly improved performance. It was accepted and entered into service as the Gewehr 43, renamed Karabiner 43 in April 1944, with production amounting to just over 400,000 between 1943 and 1945.

== Gewehr 43/Karabiner 43 ==
In 1941, Nazi Germany invaded the Soviet Union as part of Operation Barbarossa. Just prior to the opening of hostilities the Soviet Red Army had started re-arming its infantry, complementing its older bolt-action rifles with the new semi-automatic SVT-38s and SVT-40s. This was a shock to the Germans, who ramped up their own semi-automatic rifle development efforts significantly.

The SVT series used a simpler gas-operated mechanism, which was soon emulated by Walther in its successor to the G41(W), producing the Gewehr 43 (or G43). The simpler, sturdier design and mechanism of the G43 made it lighter, easier to produce, more reliable, and also much tougher than the Gewehr 41; German mountain troops would use them as ladder rungs during climbing. The addition of a 10-round stamped-steel detachable box magazine was an improvement over the integral box magazine of the G41(W). Soldiers armed with the weapon typically carried one standard stripper clip pouch and a Gewehr 43 pouch with two spare magazines. The G43 utilizes the same flapper-locked mechanism as its predecessor. The Gewehr 43 was put into production in October 1943 and followed in 1944 by the Karabiner 43 (K43), which was identical to the G43 in every way except for the letter stamped on the side. The name change from Gewehr to Karabiner (carbine) was due to the fact the barrel was actually two centimeters shorter than the standard Karabiner 98k and therefore the term Gewehr (meaning: rifle) was somewhat unfitting. The Wehrmacht intended to equip each grenadier (infantry) company in the army with 19 G43s, including 10 with scopes, for issue as the company commander saw fit. This issue was never completely achieved. The iron sight line had a hooded pointed-post-type front sight and a tangent-type rear sight with a V-shaped rear notch. These standard sight lines consisted of somewhat coarse aiming elements, making it suitable for rough field handling, aiming at distant area fire targets, and low-light usage, but less suitable for precise aiming at distant or small point targets. It is graduated for 7.92×57mm Mauser s.S. Patrone cartridges loaded with 12.8 g (198 gr) s.S. (schweres Spitzgeschoss – "heavy pointed bullet") ball bullets from 100 to 1,200 m (109 to 1,312 yd) in 100 m (109 yd) increments.

Gewehr 43s were made by Berlin-Lübecker Maschinenfabrik in Lübeck (weapons coded "duv", and later "qve"), Walther (weapons coded "AC") and the Wilhelm Gustloff Stiftung (weapons coded "bcd"). Walther used its satellite production facilities at Neuengamme concentration camp in addition to its main production facilities at Zella-Mehlis to make the rifles (It does not appear that complete weapons were assembled in the camps, similar to how Radom P35 pistols were assembled in occupied Radom, Poland without their barrels, which were built and installed by Steyr in Austria), Wilhelm Gustloff-Werke used some slave workers to augment its depleted staff from Buchenwald concentration camp. The total production by the end of the war is estimated to have been 402,713 of both models, including at least 53,435 sniper rifles: these G43/K43s were used as designated marksman/sniper weapons, fitted with the Zielfernrohr 43 (ZF 43/ZF 4) telescopic sight with 4× magnification. The weapon was originally designed for use with the Schießbecher rifle grenade launcher (standard on the Karabiner 98k as well) and the Schalldämpfer suppressor, however, these accessories were deemed unsuccessful in tests and were dropped even before the rifle made it to serial production.

The Gewehr 43 stayed in service with the Czechoslovak People's Army for several years after the war. Likewise, the East German Border Troops and Volkspolizei were issued reworked G43 rifles, which are recognizable by a sunburst proof mark near the serial number and the serial number engraved by electro pencil on removable components.

Brazil would produce two clones of the Gewehr 43. The first would be the Itajubá Model 954, and the other would be a single prototype made by the Rio de Janeiro War Arsenal.

== Other details ==
There were many small variations introduced on the G43/K43 throughout its production cycle. The important consideration is that no changes were made to the rifle design specifically to coincide with the nomenclature change from Gewehr to Karabiner, with the exception of the letter stamped on the side. A careful study of actual pieces will show that many G-marked rifles had features found on K-marked rifles and vice versa. There is therefore no difference in weight or length between the G43 and the K43. Although G43s have threaded muzzles with removable nuts for a blank adapter, the K43 does not have this feature. Variations in barrel length did exist, but those were the product of machining tolerances, differences between factories, and/or experimental long-barreled rifles. An unknown number of late-war K43 rifles were chambered for the 7.92×33mm Kurz cartridge and modified to accept StG 44 magazines.

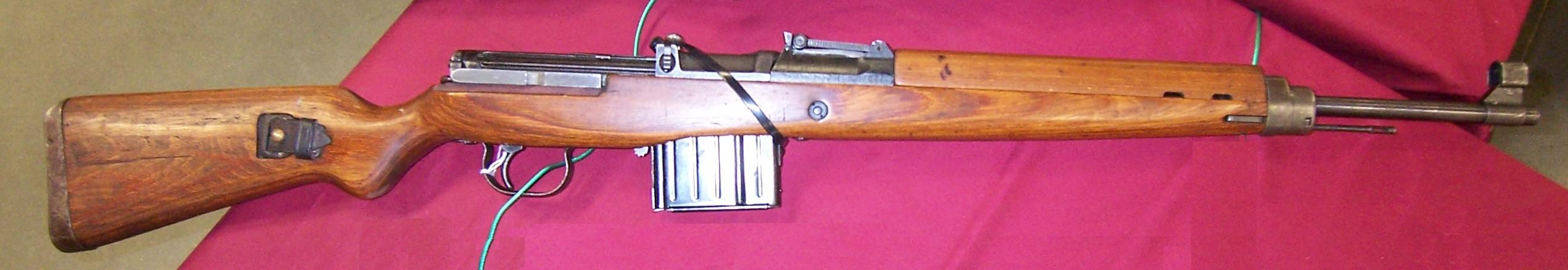
K43 with mounting rail

Though most G43/K43s are equipped with a telescopic sight mounting rail, the vast majority of the rifles were issued in their standard infantry form without a scope. About 50,000 scoped variants of the G43/K43sG.43 were produced. When equipped with a scope, it was exclusively the ZF 4, a 4x magnification telescopic sight. The ZF4 was adjustable for elevation and windage using drums. The range drum on top featured bullet drop compensation in 50 m (55 yd) increments for ranges from 100 to 800 m (109 to 875 yd). No other known scope and scope mount combinations were installed by the German military on G43/K43's during World War II. Many strange variations have shown up after the war, but all have been proven to be the work of amateur gunsmiths. Rifles with broken-off butts are common, as German soldiers were instructed to render semi-automatic rifles useless when in danger of capture.

== Gewehr-43-based Gerät 03 prototype ==
Gerät 03 prototype roller locked action diagram

In June 1943, the Mauser Werke's Weapons Research Institute and Weapons Development Group decided to adopt the Gewehr 43 design to use a relatively cheap to produce roller locked action. The production pattern Gewehr 43 used a more expensive to produce and less sturdy Kjellman-style flapper locking system. These locking methods are similar in concept. By December 1943, Mauser Werke's Weapons Research Institute and Weapons Development Group had completed a roller-locked prototype rifle designated as the Gerät 03. Aside from the differing action, the Gerät 03 prototype resembled the Gewehr 43. Although the prototype rifle was machined it was designed with pressing and stamping steel components production methods in mind to simplify mass production and keep production costs low. Only a few prototypes were built and the Gerät 03 never went into production, but the Gerät 03 was put through a 5,000-round endurance trial. The Gerät 03 semi-automatic rifle used a fully locked action design with a gas system, using a gas piston to unlock. During test firing, the development group noticed an undesirable tendency in the Gerät 03 action to exhibit bolt-bounce. It was possible to unintentionally fire the Gerät 03 during the bounce phase, at which the action was not fully locked. This opened the Gerät 03 action much faster and under much higher pressure than the gas system was supposed to allow. This observation of a harmonics problem in the roller/wedge system led to the idea and development of the intentionally never fully locked roller-delayed blowback action design, which does not require a gas system.

== Shooters kits for historic rifles ==
The original gas system of the Gewehr 43 is copiously gassed and was designed for using World War II German service ammunition in the presence of heavy fouling or icing. Being ammunition specific, the gas system was not adjustable to various propellant and projectile-specific pressure behavior and so modern (higher pressure C.I.P. conform 7.92×57mm Mauser) ammunition can move the gas piston overly fast and hard against the bolt carrier which in turn hits the receiver harder. Especially on late war Gewehr 43s the steel quality of the sheet metal rear of the receiver could be poor and the heat treatment of the bolt carrier could be suboptimal. This can lead to increased wear and damage to guns and in worse scenarios possibly endanger shooters. For shooting historic Gewehr 43s commercial "shooters kits" have been developed that basically replace the gas cup and the gas plug with new ones, and the gas plug is threaded to accept different sized gas orifices so the gas system can be adjusted to cycle reliably with the specific pressure behavior of the ammunition used.

== Users ==
- Brazil: Local copy by IMBEL as the "M954 Mosquetão". Only a few units were made and it was never fully adopted.
- Czechoslovakia: Used post-war.
- East Germany: Used post-war.
- France: Used post-war in French Indochina
- Nazi Germany
- Romania: Received a very small number from Nazi Germany
- Guatemala: Bought from Czechoslovakia before the 1954 coup
- : Irish National Liberation Army

== See also ==
- List of World War II firearms of Germany
- Mondragón rifle
- Type Hēi
- AG-42
- M1 Garand
- SVT-40
- MAS-49 rifle
