= M1922 Bang rifle =

M1922 rifle
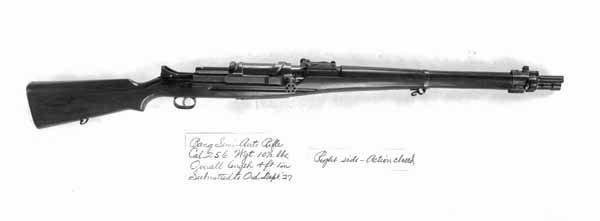
- The Model 1922 Bang rifle using the sliding muzzle-cap system.
- Type: Semi-automatic rifle
- Place of origin: United States

Production history
- Designer: Søren Hansen Bang

Specifications
- Cartridge: .30-06 Springfield, 6.5×55mm Swedish
- Action: gas-operated, rotating bolt
- Sights: iron sights

The Model 1922 Bang rifle is a US semi-automatic rifle designed by Danish arms designer Søren Hansen Bang. It was a modification of the earlier 1909 and Model 1911 Bang rifles, both chambered in the .30-06 Springfield round.

== Overview ==

It was gas operated, using a sliding muzzle cup system blown forward by the combustion gases while the bullet emerged from the barrel. This ".256 Bang" rifle was a top candidate from 1925 to 1928 for US contracts ultimately won by the M1 Garand. Bang demonstrated his models in US field trials in 1919 and 1927. The Bang rifle was ultimately unsuccessful in US testing because of its mechanical complexity and susceptibility to fouling of the sliding muzzle cup.

The Bang blow-forward gas system, originally developed in 1903, inspired several other weapons: it was used in the unsuccessful French Puteaux APX machine gun of 1904, its direct successor the controversial St. Étienne Mle 1907 machine-gun, and in the Gewehr 41, all of which suffered the same shortcomings.

== Patents ==
- U.S. patent 901,143, October 13, 1908, Device for Automatic Firing of Self-Loading Arms, Inventor Søren H. Bang of Copenhagen, Denmark
- U.S. patent 1,534,486, April 21, 1925, Self-Loading Firearm, Inventor Søren H. Bang of Copenhagen, Denmark
