= SVT-40 =

Soviet semi-automatic rifle

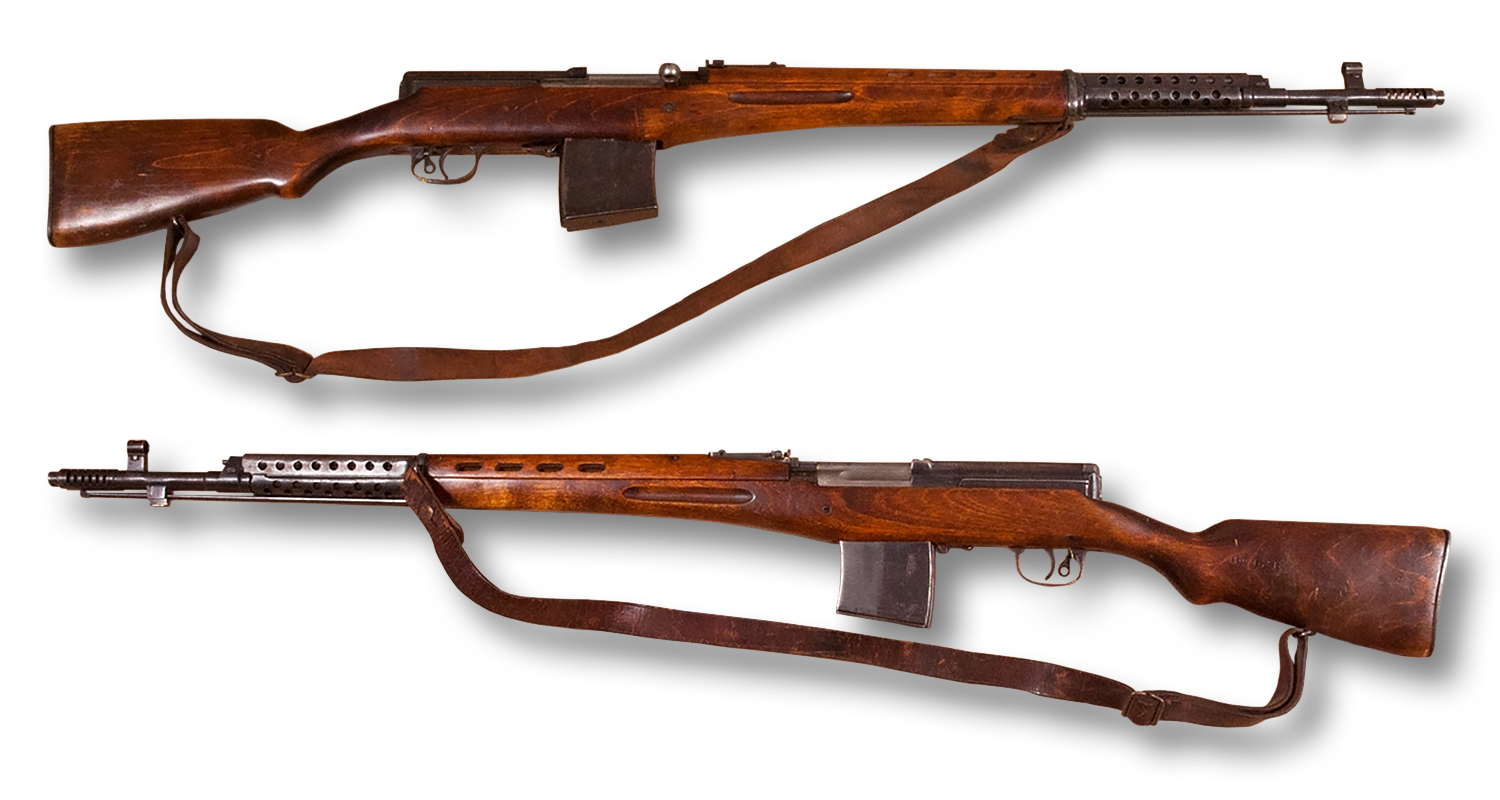
- SVT-40 from the Swedish Army Museum, Stockholm
- Type: Semi-automatic rifle
- Place of origin: Soviet Union

Service history
- In service: 1938–present (SVT-38); 1940–present (SVT-40)
- Used by: See Users
- Wars: Winter War; World War II; Korean War; Russo-Ukrainian War

Production history
- Designer: Fedor Tokarev
- Designed: 1938 (updated 1940)
- Produced: 1938–1945
- No. built: SVT-38: 150,000; SVT-40: 1,600,000
- Variants: SVT-38, SVT-40

Specifications
- Mass: 3.85 kilograms (8.5 lb) unloaded
- Length: 1,226 millimetres (48.3 in)
- Barrel length: 625 millimetres (24.6 in)
- Cartridge: 7.62×54mmR
- Action: Gas-operated short-stroke piston, tilting bolt
- Muzzle velocity: 830–840 m/s (2,720–2,760 ft/s) (light bullet arr. 1908)
- Effective firing range: 500 metres (550 yd), 1,000 metres (1,100 yd)+ (with scope)
- Feed system: 10-round detachable box magazine

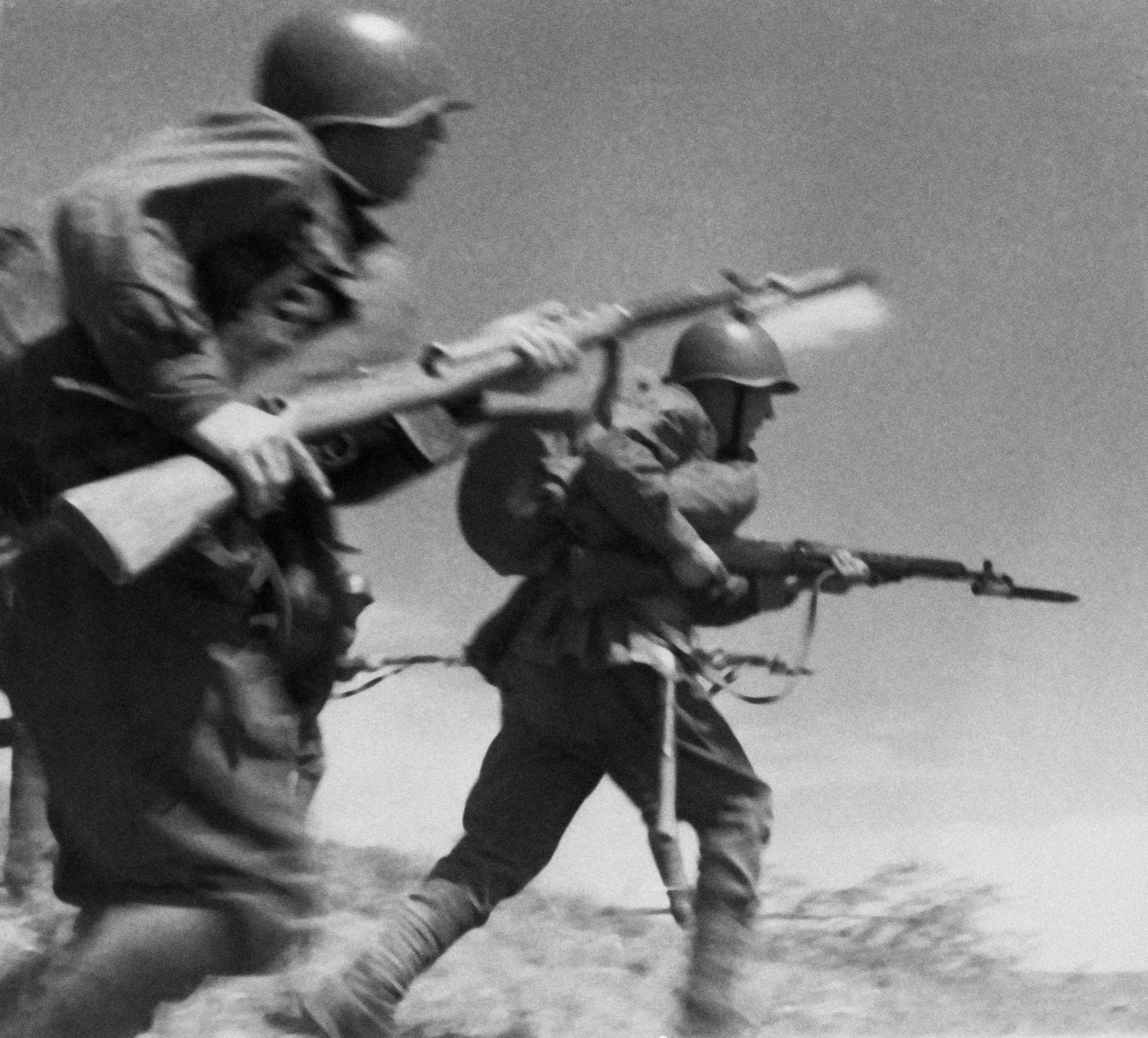
Soviet soldiers with SVT-40 rifles.

The SVT-40 (Russian: Самозарядная винтовка Токарева, образец 1940 года, romanized: Samozaryadnaya vintovka Tokareva, obrazets 1940 goda, lit. 'Tokarev's self-loading rifle, model of 1940') is a semi-automatic battle rifle developed in the Soviet Union that saw widespread service during and after World War II. It was intended to be the new service rifle of the Soviet Red Army. However, its production was disrupted by the Axis invasion in 1941, resulting in a change back to the Mosin–Nagant rifle for the duration of the war, although both rifles served concurrently.

== History ==
In the early 1930s, the Soviet Union requested the development of a semi-automatic rifle to replace the Mosin-Nagant, taking inspiration from the Mexican Mondragón rifle. The design was left up to two individuals, Sergei Simonov and Fedor Tokarev. Simonov, who had experience in developing the Fedorov Avtomat, created a prototype for the AVS-36 in 1931. The rifle was used during the Winter War but was removed from service in 1941 due to design flaws.

=== SVT-38 ===
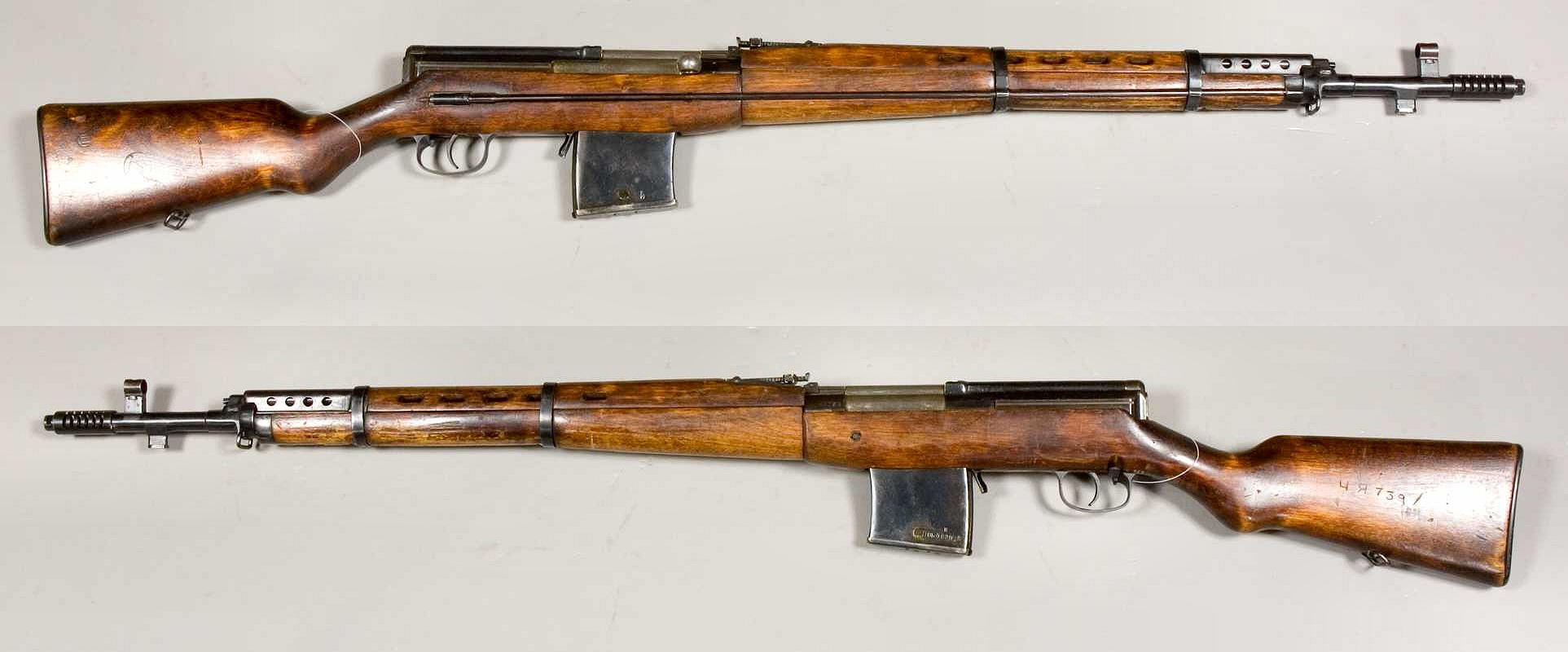
SVT-38

In 1938, Tokarev's rifle was accepted for production, under the designation SVT-38 with hopes that it would become the new standard-issue rifle of the Red Army. Ambitious production plans anticipated two million rifles per year by 1942. Production began at Tula Arsenal in July 1939 (production at Izhmash began in late 1939).

The SVT-38 is a gas-operated rifle with a short-stroke, spring-loaded piston above the barrel and a tilting bolt, a system that would later be used in the FN FAL. The SVT-38 was equipped with a bayonet and a 10-round detachable magazine. The receiver was open-top, which enabled reloading of the magazine using five-round Mosin–Nagant stripper clips. The sniper variant had an additional locking notch for a see-through scope mount and was equipped with a 3.5×21 PU telescopic sight.

The SVT-38 saw its combat debut in the 1939–1940 Winter War with Finland. The rifle had many design flaws, as its gas port was prone to fouling, the magazine would sometimes fall out during use, and it was inaccurate, only being effective up to 600m. Production of the SVT-38 was terminated in April 1940 after some 150,000 examples had been manufactured.

=== SVT-40 ===
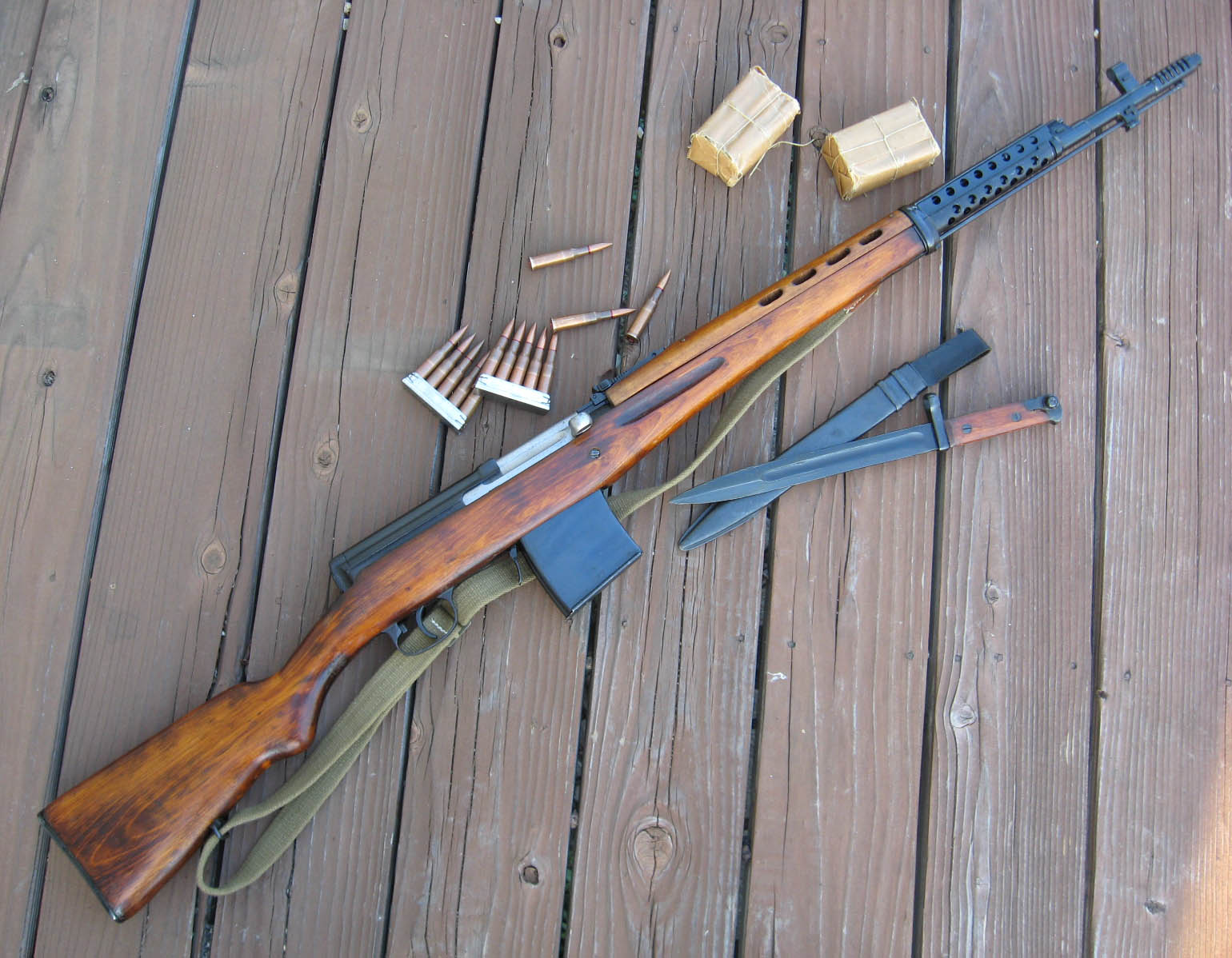
SVT-40

With the removal of the SVT-38 from service, an improved design, the SVT-40, entered production. It was a more refined, lighter design incorporating a folding magazine release and lightening cuts on the trigger guard. The lower hand guard was now of one-piece construction and the cleaning rod was housed under the barrel and had its design simplified. Other changes were made to simplify manufacturing, such as shrinking the muzzle brake and shortening the bayonet. Production of the improved version began in July 1940 at Tula and later at factories in Izhevsk and Podolsk. Production of the Mosin–Nagant M1891/30 bolt-action rifle continued, and it remained the standard-issue rifle to Red Army troops, with the SVT-40 more often issued to non-commissioned officers and elite units like the naval infantry. Since these factories already had experience manufacturing the SVT-38, output increased quickly and an estimated 70,000 SVT-40s were produced in 1940.

By the time of Operation Barbarossa, the Axis invasion of the USSR in June 1941, the SVT-40 was already in widespread use by the Red Army. In a Soviet infantry division's table of organization and equipment, one-third of rifles were supposed to be SVTs, though in practice they seldom achieved this ratio. The first months of the war were disastrous for the Soviet Union; they lost hundreds of thousands of SVT-40s. To make up for this, the production of the Mosin–Nagant rifles was reintroduced. In contrast, the SVT was more difficult to manufacture, and troops with only rudimentary training had difficulty maintaining it. Submachine guns like the PPSh-41 had proven their value as simple, cheap, and effective weapons to supplement infantry firepower. This led to a gradual decline in SVT production. In 1941, over one million SVTs were produced but in 1942 Izhevsk arsenal was ordered to cease SVT production and switch back to the Mosin–Nagant 91/30. Only 264,000 SVTs were manufactured in 1942 and production continued to diminish until the order to cease production was finally given in January 1945. Total production of the SVT-38/40 was around 1,600,000 rifles, of which 51,710 were the SVT-40 sniper variant.

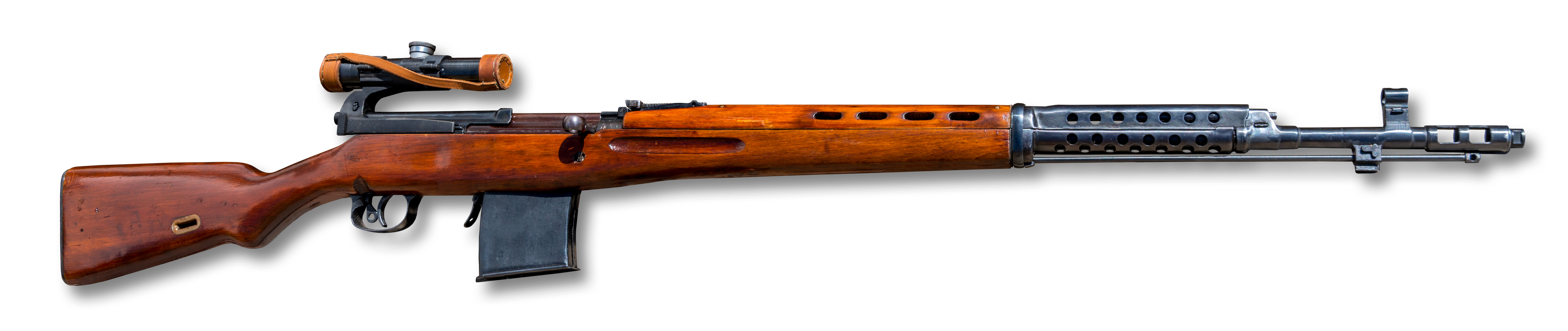
A 1941 Tula SVT-40 with PU 3.5×21 telescopic sight in original sniper configuration

SVTs frequently suffered from vertical shot dispersion; the army reported that the rifles were of "flimsy construction and there were difficulties experienced in their repair and maintenance". The stock, made of Arctic Birch, was prone to cracking in the wrist from recoil. This was generally remedied by drilling and inserting one or two large industrial crossbolts horizontally into the stock just before the wrist meets the receiver. Many rifles were also poorly seated in their stocks, letting the receiver shift on firing. This led to a field modification that selectively shimmed the stock with birch chips, usually around the receiver and in between where the wood stock meets the lower metal handguard. For a sniper rifle, this was unacceptable and production of the specialized sniper variant of the SVT was terminated in 1942. Milling scope rails in the receivers of standard SVT rifles was also discontinued. Other production changes included a new, simpler muzzle brake design with two vents per-side instead of the six on the original.

=== AVT-40 automatic rifle ===
To supplement the Red Army's shortage of machine guns, an SVT version capable of full-automatic fire (designated the AVT-40) was ordered into production on 20 May 1942; the first batches reached the troops in July. It was externally similar to the SVT, but its modified safety also acted as a fire selector allowing for both semi-automatic and fully automatic fire modes. When fired automatically the rifle had a rate of fire of approximately 750 RPM, faster than the DP machine gun which fired the same cartridge at 550 RPM. To better resist the stress of automatic fire, the AVT featured a slightly stouter stock made of hardwood usually distinguished with a large “A” engraved in it; surplus AVT stocks were later used on refurbished SVTs. The automatic fire was largely uncontrollable, and the rifles often suffered breakages under the increased strain. Documents discovered after the war indicated that during testing, under continuous automatic fire, an AVT-40's barrel would be "shot out", meaning the rifling in the barrel would be completely worn down, in as little as 200-250 rounds. The use of the AVT's automatic fire mode was subsequently prohibited, and production of the rifle was relatively brief; none were made after the summer of 1943. 15 round and larger magazines appear to have been experimented with.

=== SKT-40 ===
A shorter carbine version SKT-40 (СКТ-40) was designed in 1940 and was submitted to a competitive test with a design of Simonov in the same year; neither was accepted for service. Later, a prototype version chambered for the new, shorter, 7.62×39mm round was developed, but was not accepted for production.

=== AT-44 ===
An assault rifle based on a scaled-down SVT with 7.62×41mm chambering called the AT-44 was also put into development, it came with a bipod and pistol grip. It was competing with the AS-44 design. It failed to be accepted for similar reliability issues as the AVT.

A silenced variation of the SVT-40 was also experimented with, though it too ended in failure.

== SVTs outside of the Soviet Union ==
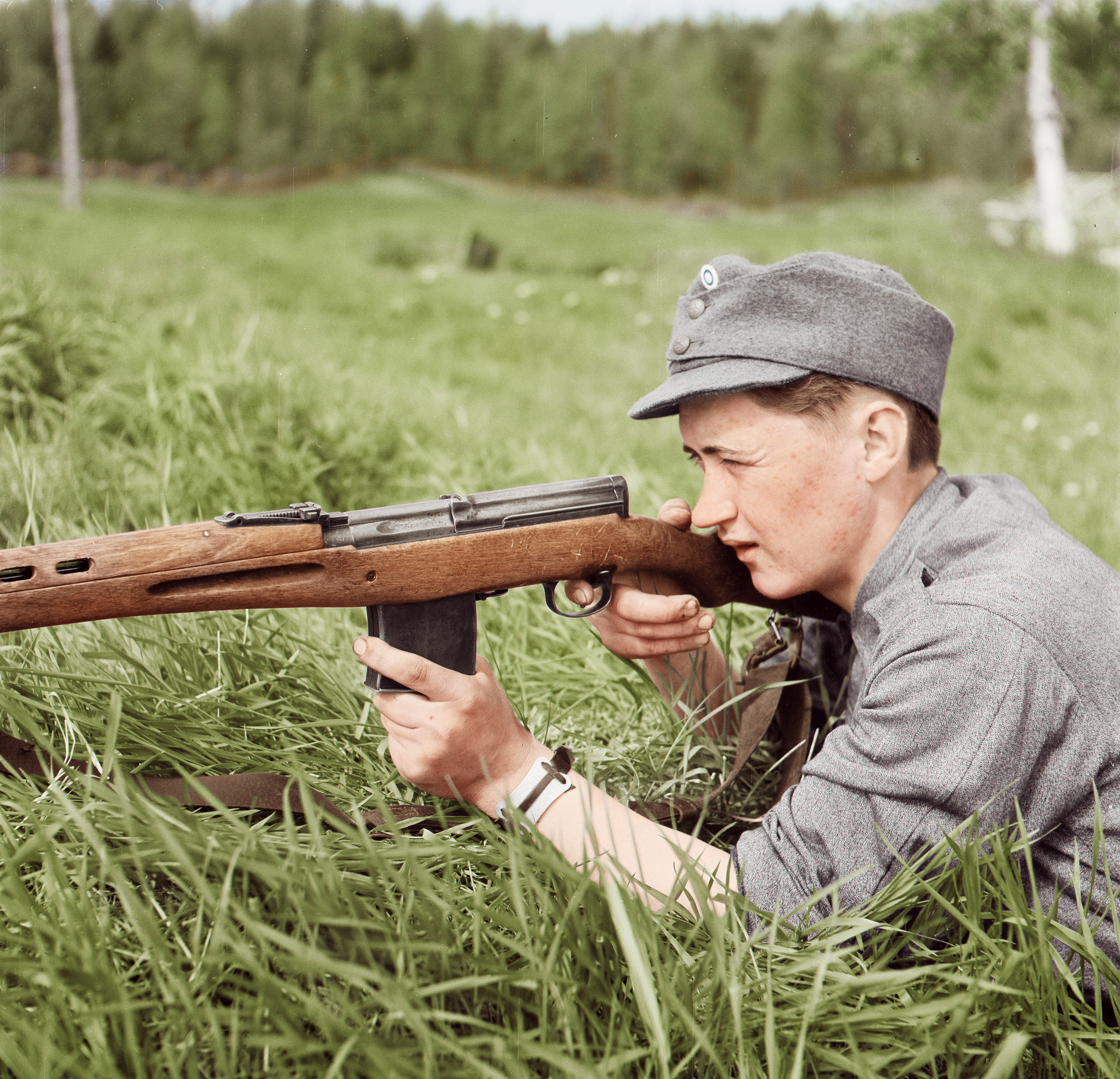
Estonian soldier with an SVT-40 in Finland, 1944

The first country outside the Soviet Union to employ the SVT was Finland, which captured some 2,700 SVT-38s during the Winter War, and over 15,000 SVTs during the Continuation War. The SVT saw extensive use in Finnish hands. The Finns even attempted to make their own clone of the SVT-38 designated Tapako, though only a prototype was ever conceived. The Finns would continue to experiment with producing their own SVT based rifles until the late 1950s with the introduction of the RK-62.

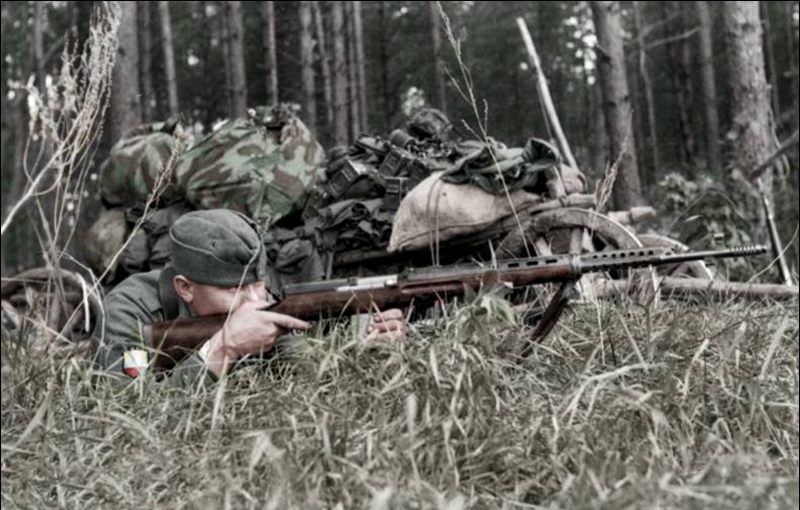
German soldier with a captured SVT-40 rifle

Germany captured several hundred thousand SVTs from the Eastern Front. As the Germans were short of self-loading rifles themselves, SVT-38 and 40s, designated respectively as Selbstladegewehr 258(r) and Selbstladegewehr 259(r) by the Wehrmacht, saw widespread use by Germany. The study of the SVT's gas-operated action also aided in the development of the German Gewehr 43 rifle. The SVT-40 rifle was also favored by the Germans because unlike the G43 rifles, they could be fixed with a bayonet.

During the 1940s, Switzerland began looking into equipping its military with semi-auto rifles. Although never officially adopted, W+F Bern produced a clone of the SVT with a 6-round 7.5×55mm Swiss magazine called the AK44.

Italy also produced at least one prototype loosely copying an SVT, which is extant in Beretta's collection, but its designation or exact details are unknown.

== Post-war ==
After the war, SVTs were mostly withdrawn from service and refurbished in arsenals, then stored. In Soviet service, firearms like the SKS and the AK-47 as well as the later SVD made the SVT obsolete, and the rifle was generally out of service by 1955. Only a few SVTs were exported to Soviet allies and clients. The Korean People's Army reportedly received some before the Korean War. The Finnish Army retired the SVT in 1958, and about 7,500 rifles were sold to the United States civilian market through firearm importer Interarms. This marked the end of SVTs in regular service.

In the Soviet Union, some SVTs (without bayonets) were sold as civilian hunting rifles, although other SVTs were kept in storage until the 1990s, when many rifles were sold abroad, along with other surplus military firearms.

== Users ==
=== Current users ===
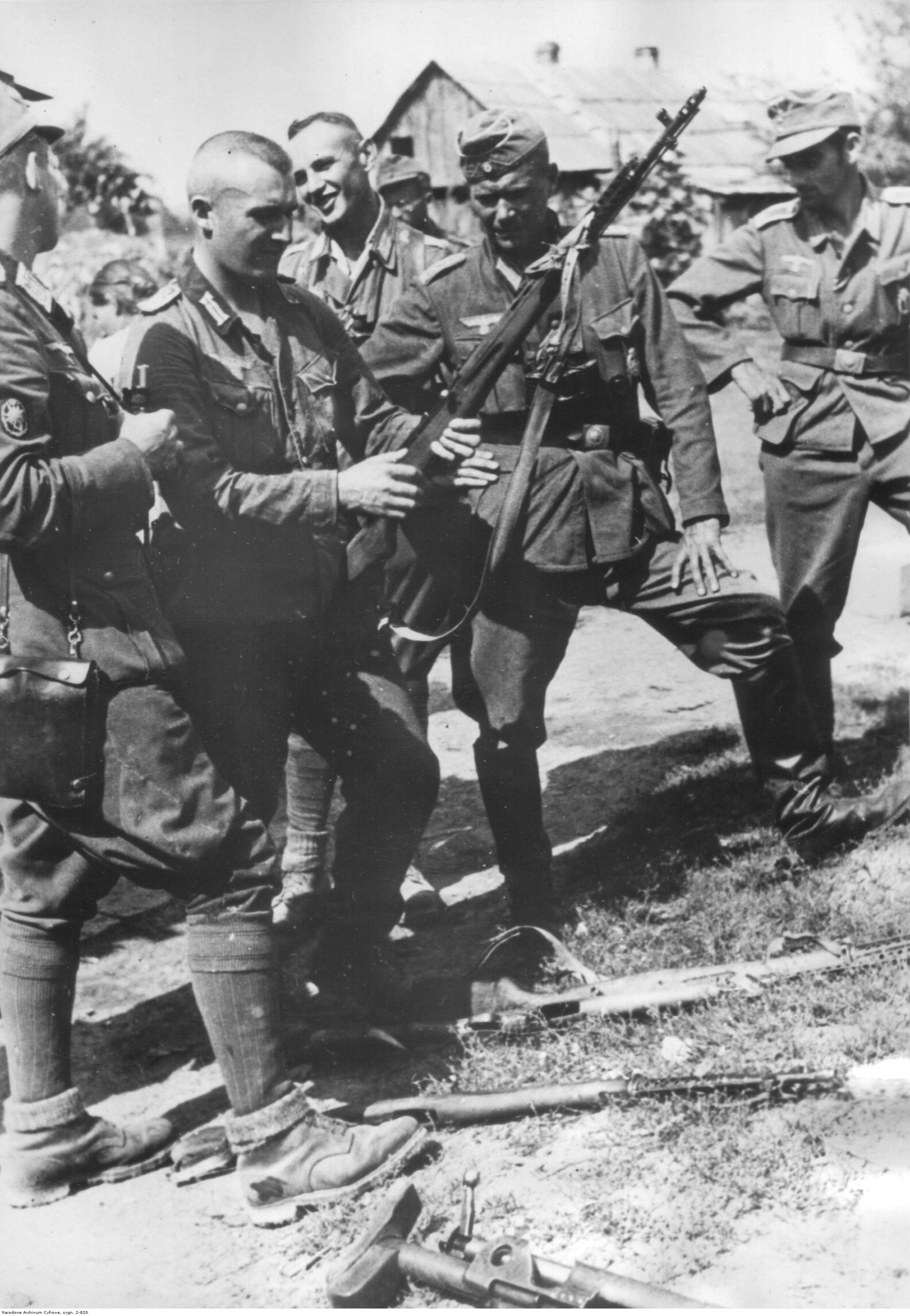
A trophy SVT rifle being inspected by German troops, 1942.

- Luhansk People's Republic: Donated by Russia and used by the Luhansk People's Militia.
- Russia: Limited numbers of SVT-40s issued to militias in Luhansk.
- Ukraine: 10,000 serviceable SVT-40s in storage as of 2011. Limited use with Territorial Defence units during the Russian invasion of Ukraine.

=== Former users ===
- Croatia
- Czechoslovakia: 1st Czechoslovak Independent Brigade in the USSR
- (Estonia) Estonian partisans: Used during and after World War II.
- Finland: Captured from Soviet troops, AVT-40 version also used. Finnish captured SVT-38s, 40s and AVT-40s have a [SA] property stamp.
- Georgia: Used during civil conflicts in the 1990s.
- East Germany
- Nazi Germany: Captured from Soviet troops, designated as Selbstladegewehr 259(r).
- Italian Partisans: Used examples captured from German soldiers.
- North Korea: Used during the Korean War.
- Lithuania: Lithuanian civil Police used captured SVT-40s during the German occupation.
- Poland: Polish Armed Forces in the East
- Soviet Union
- Ukrainian Insurgent Army: SVT-38 and SVT-40 captured from Germans and Soviets.
- Vietnam

== Museum exhibits ==
- One SVT-38 rifle, one SVT-40 rifle and one SKT-40 carbine are in the collection of Tula State Arms Museum in Tula Kremlin
- One SVT-38 on display at the Swedish Army Museum.
- Three SVT-40 rifles along with experimental extended magazines, including a drum, are on display at the Military Historical Museum of Artillery, Engineers and Signal Corps in St. Petersburg
- Three SVT-40 rifles and one carbine are on display at the J.M. Davis Arms & Historical Museum in Claremore, Oklahoma
- One SVT-40 is on display at the Minnesota Military Museum at Fort Ripley Little Falls, Minnesota

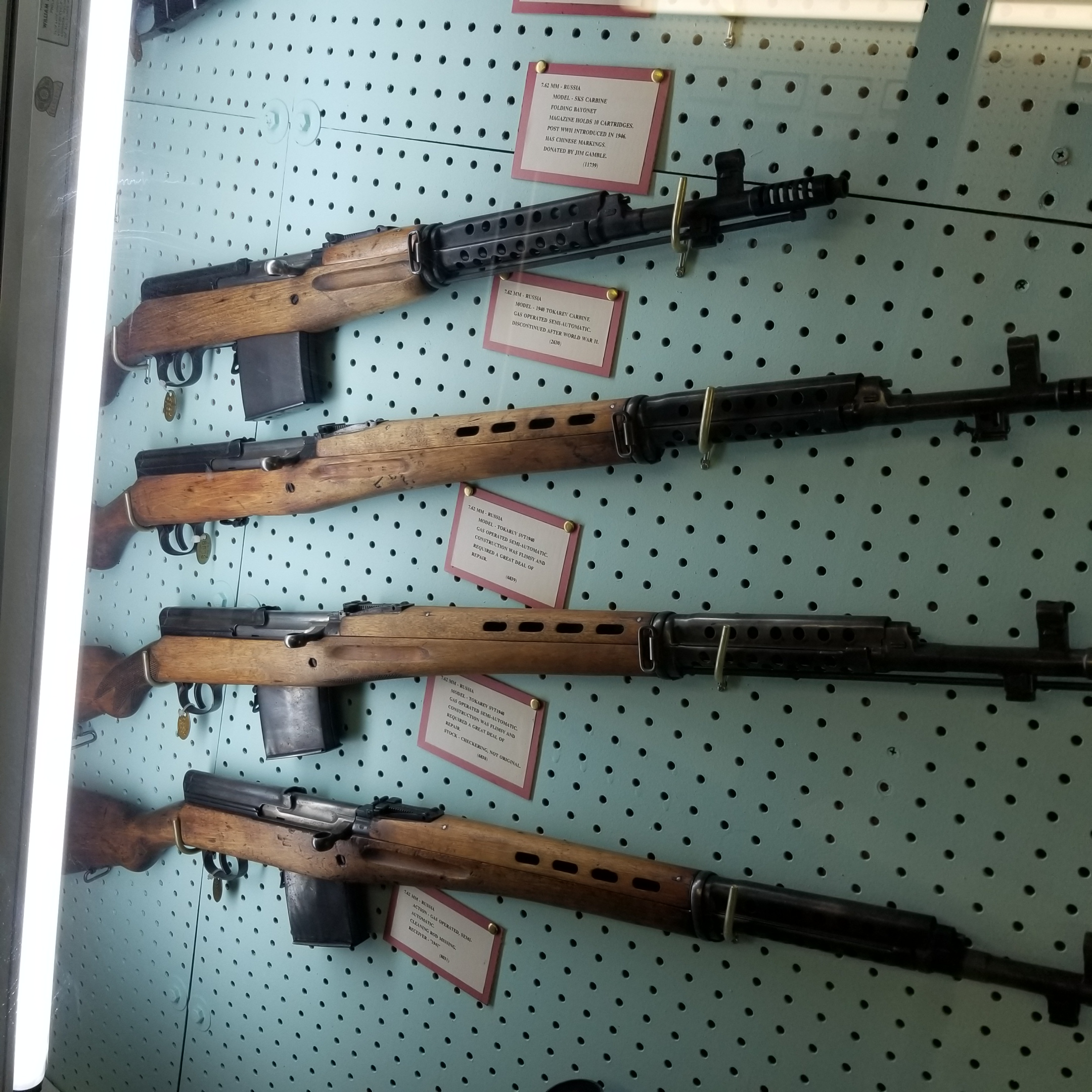
SVT rifles at the J.M. Davis Arms and Historical Museum

== See also ==
- FG 42
- List of Russian weaponry
- M1 Garand
- M1941 Johnson rifle
