= Gewehr 41 =

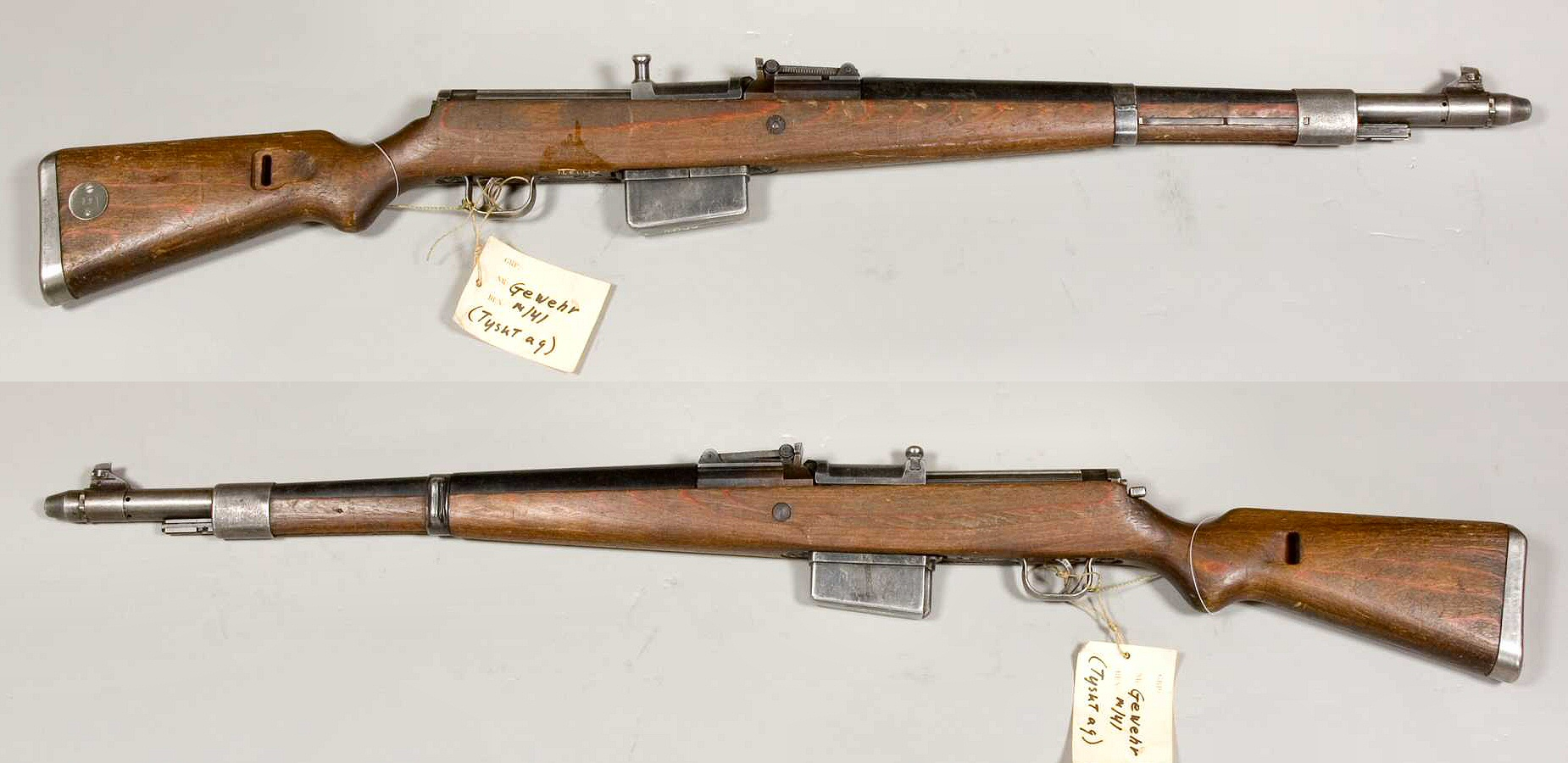
- Gewehr 41-W (Walther version)
- Type: Semi-automatic rifle
- Place of origin: Nazi Germany

Service history
- In service: 1941–1945
- Used by: See operators
- Wars: World War II

Production history
- Designed: 1941
- No. built: up to 120,000

Specifications
- Mass: 4.9 kg (11 lb)
- Length: 1,140 mm (45 in)
- Barrel length: 546 mm (21.5 in)
- Cartridge: 7.92×57mm Mauser
- Action: Gas-operated, gas trap/ bolt action (G41(M))
- Rate of fire: 20 to 30 rounds per minute
- Muzzle velocity: 776 m/s (2,546 ft/s)
- Effective firing range: 400 m (440 yd)
- Feed system: 10-round non-detachable magazine

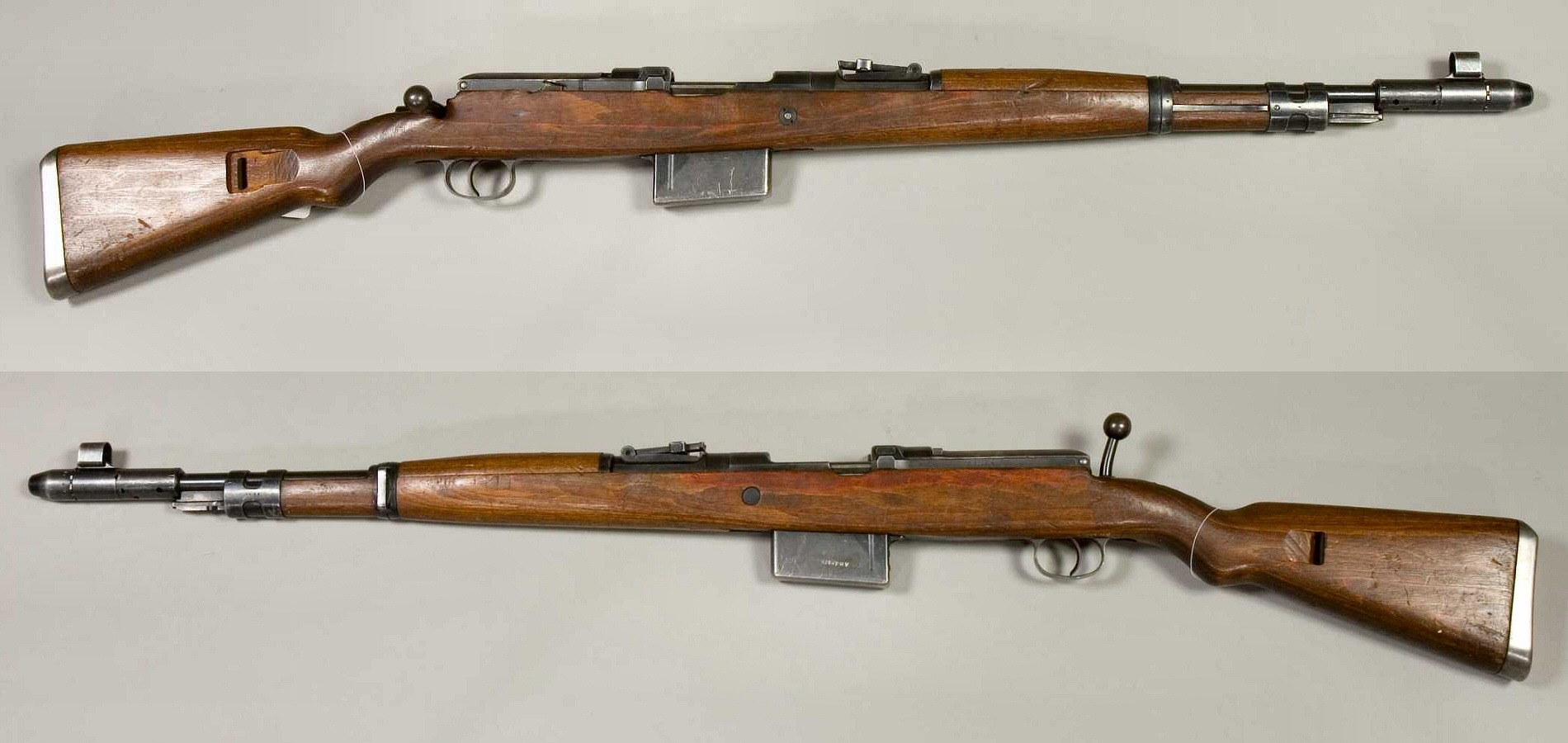
Gewehr 41-M (Mauser version) semi-automatic rifle

The Gewehr 41 English: Rifle 41, commonly known as the G41(W) or G41(M), denoting the manufacturer (Walther/Mauser), are two distinct and different Semi-automatic rifles manufactured and used by Germany during World War II. The Walther variant of the G41 was far more common and successful in German military service. They were largely superseded by the improved Gewehr 43, which was derived from the G41(W) although both rifles served concurrently until the end of the war.

== Background ==
While the Germans experimented with semi-automatic rifles as early as 1901, they didn't consider introducing such a weapon until the Soviets began issuing the SVT-40 rifle in large numbers for their troops.

German semi-automatic recoil-operated prototypes proved to be too heavy and not meeting military requirements during trials, while their experience with the Mondragón rifle during World War 1, and studies on captured RSC M1917 rifles, both of which had several flaws, left the German High Command skeptical of gas-operated rifles in general, relying instead on tried and tested Mauser bolt-action rifles and recoil-operated light machine guns.

Samples of AVS-36 rifles captured during the Spanish Civil War were studied by the Germans, but apparently they still considered gas systems as too impractical for military rifles.

During the early years of WWII, the Germans were becoming increasingly aware of other nations adopting semi-automatic rifles in large numbers: besides the AVS-36, the Soviets introduced the SVT-38 (and later the improved SVT-40), while the Americans adopted the M1 Garand to increase their infantry's firepower. According to Smith, the Germans were so familiar with the Garand upon its introduction that popular firearms publications in Germany included photos and descriptions of the M1. The Gewehr 41 would later incorporate a gas trap system similar to the early Garand.

In 1940, the Army high command launched a competitive program for a new semi-auto rifle, with Mauser and Walther as the main competitors, and the following restrictions placed upon the design:

- no holes were to be bored into the barrel for tapping gas for the loading mechanism;
- the rifles were not to have any moving parts on the surface;
- and in case the auto-loading mechanism failed, a bolt action was to be included.

== Description ==
Both designs used a mechanism known as the "Bang" system (after its Danish designer Søren H. Bang). In this system, propellant gases were captured by a cone-shaped gas trap at the muzzle, which in turn deflected them to operate a small piston which in turn pushed on a long piston rod that opened the breech and re-loaded the gun. This is as opposed to the more common type of gas-actuated system, in which gases are tapped off from the barrel, and pushed back on a piston to open the breech to the rear. They also used the 7.92×57mm Mauser round, having a range comparable to the standard-issue Karabiner 98k rifle. In comparison to the Kar98k, the Gewehr 41 rifles were longer and heavier, and the only advantages they offered were limited to a higher rate of fire and an extra five rounds in the magazine.

The Mauser design, the G41(M), was the only one of the two that respected the criteria imposed. It proved to be unreliable during trials and impractical for field use. The G41(M) was striker-fired, rotating-bolt locking, and featured a traditional bolt handle/charging handle that automatically disconnected the bolt assembly from the recoil spring should the rifle be used in manual mode. The bolt system was in many ways analogous to the straight-pull Mannlicher M1895 rifle. Only 6,673 were produced before production was halted, and of these, nearly 1,700 were returned as unusable.

The Walther design was more successful because the designers had simply ignored some of the restrictions placed by the German High Command (namely no moving parts on the surface of the gun, and the inclusion of a manual bolt-action backup mechanism). However it was still a heavy, complex, and unreliable weapon. The G41(W) was produced in small numbers (up to 7,500 in total) before it was officially adopted by the German Army as the Gewehr 41. According to McNab, around 120,000 Gewehr 41s were made in total.

While the breech locking and firing systems on the G41(W) proved to be cheap and satisfactory enough for field use, the complex gas trap system proved to be difficult to be kept meticulously clean in the field resulting in malfunctions, often suffering from carbon fouling and/or corrosion.

According to Pegler, the Gewehr 41 performance was on par with the Soviet SVT-38. Like the Tokarev rifle, the gas system had to be carefully adjusted. Use of poor-quality ammunition would result in failure to feed rounds or extract spent cartridge cases if the pressure was too low; on the other hand, if the pressure was too high it would rip off the cartridge cases, causing the gun to jam.

The G41(W) was thoroughly tested at the Aberdeen Proving Ground, where its reliability proved to be inferior to the M1 Garand under severe conditions, especially when exposed to mud and rain. Mechanical breakdowns during testing were also frequent.

== History ==
It was mostly used in the Eastern Front, where it proved to be less than successful due to the excessive weight and complexity of the Bang system, but it was the only semi-auto rifle the Germans were producing in significant quantities until the introduction of the improved Gewehr 43.

The Gewehr 41 was redesigned in 1943 into the Gewehr 43, utilizing a short-stroke piston copied from the SVT-40 rifle, and implementing a conventional detachable box magazine, while keeping the Gewehr 41 locking system. Despite this, the remaining Gewehr 41s were kept in service for the rest of the war.

Some German-trained units of the Italian Social Republic such as the 2nd Grenadier Division "Littorio", 3rd Marine Infantry Division "San Marco" and the 4th Alpine Division "Monterosa" were equipped with German weapons including G41(W) rifles.

== Operators ==
- Nazi Germany
- Italian Social Republic − Received some rifles in 1944
