= List of semi-automatic rifles =

A semi-automatic rifle is a rifle that fires a single round each time the trigger is pulled, and uses some of the energy from that firing to load the next round. Semi-automatic rifles are also known as self-loading rifles ('SLR') or auto-loading rifles.

Name	Manufacturer	Image	Cartridge	Country	Year
Adaptive Combat Rifle	Remington Arms; Bushmaster		5.56×45mm 6.8mm Remington SPC	US	2006
Accuracy International AS50	Accuracy International		.50 BMG	UK	2007
Ag m/42	Carl Gustafs Stads Gevärsfaktori		6.5×55mm	Sweden	1942
AGM-1 carbine	AL.GI.MEC.Srl, Via Melzi d'Eril 21, I-20154 Milan		9x19 Parabellum	Italy	
AK-22	Cugir Arms Factory		.22 LR	Romania	
AMT Lightning 25/22	Arcadia Machine & Tool		.22 LR	US	1984
AR-57	AR57 LLC		FN 5.7×28mm	US	2008
ARG S 40	SAKO		5.56x45mm NATO	Finland	2025
Armaguerra Mod. 39 rifle			6.5×52mm Carcano 7.65×53mm Mauser	Italy	1939
Armalite AR-7	Armalite		.22 LR	US	1959
AR10T	Armalite		.308 Winchester; 7.62×51mm NATO	US	1956
Armscor AK22	Armscor		.22 LR	PHL	1987
Armscor M16 22	Armscor		.22 LR	PHL	
Barrett 50 Cal/M82/M107	Barrett Firearms Manufacturing		.50 BMG.416 Barrett	US	1989
Barrett XM109	Barrett Firearms Manufacturing		25×59mm	US	1990s
Barrett XM500	Barrett Firearms Manufacturing		.50 BMG	US	2006
BCL 102	Black Creek Laboratories		.308 Winchester; 7.62×51mm NATO; 6.5mm Creedmoor	Canada	2017
Bear Creek Arsenal Huntmaster BC-8	Bear Creek Arsenal		.30-06 Springfield	US	2024
Benelli Argo	Benelli Armi SpA			Italy	
Benelli Argo Comfortech	Benelli Armi SpA			Italy	
Benelli Argo EL	Benelli Armi SpA			Italy	
Benelli MR1	Benelli Armi SpA		5.56 mm NATO.223 Rem	Italy	2005
Beretta BM59	Beretta		7.62×51mm NATO	Italy	1959
Beretta Cx4 Storm	Beretta		9×19mm Parabellum; 9×21mm IMI.40 S&W.45 ACP	Italy	2003
Beretta Rx4 Storm	Benelli Armi for Beretta		5.56×45mm NATO.223 Rem	Italy	2005
Berkut rifle	KBP Instrument Design Bureau		.308 Winchester; 7.62×54mmR; 9×53mmR	RUS	1998
Big Horn Armory AR500	Big Horn Armory		.500 Auto Max	US	2010s
Breda M1935 PG Rifle	Breda		6.5×52mm Mannlicher-Carcano; 7×57mm Mauser	Italy	1931
Browning 22 Semi-Auto rifle	FN Herstal		.22 LR	BEL	1914
Browning BAR	Browning Arms Company			BEL	
Bushmaster Arm Pistol	Gwinn Firearms Company; Bushmaster Firearms International		5.56×45mm NATO	US	1972
Bushmaster M4 Bushmaster XM-15	Bushmaster Firearms International		.223 Remington, 5.56x45 NATO (Bushmaster M4 & XM15); 6.8mm Remington SPC, 7.62×39mm (Bushmaster M4)	US	1990s
C6	Louis Chauchat & M Sutter at Puteaux Arsenal		7x59mm	France	1907
Calico Liberty	Calico Light Weapons Systems		9x19 Parabellum	US	1980s
Calico M100	Calico Light Weapons Systems		.22 LR	US	1980s
Carbon 15	Bushmaster Firearms International		9×19mm Parabellum.223 Remington; 5.56×45mm NATO	US	2006
Cetme C	Cetme		7.62x51mm NATO	Spain	
Cetme L	Cetme		5.56×45mm NATO	Spain	
Charlton Automatic Rifle	Charlton Motor Workshops; Electrolux		.303 British	New Zealand	1942
Colt AR-15 Semi Automatic AR15 Variants	Colt		.223 Remington; 5.56×45mm NATO	US	1960s
CSA SA VZ-58	Czech Small Arms		7.62×39mm.222 Remington.223 Remington	Czech Republic	2000s
Diemaco C20 DMR	Colt Canada		7.62x51mm NATO	Canada	2020
Daewoo DR-100	Daewoo Precision Industries		5.56×45mm NATO.223 Remington	KOR	1987
Crazy Horse rifle	Smith Enterprise Inc.		7.62×51mm NATO	US	2003
CZ 511	Česká Zbrojovka Uherský Brod		.22 LR	CZ	
Demro TAC-1	Demro		.45 ACP	US	1975
Dragunov SVD	Kalashnikov Concern		7.62×54mmR	Soviet Union	1963
Dragunov SVU	KBP Instrument Design Bureau		7.62×54mmR	Russia	1994
FEG Model 58	Fegyver És Gépgyár		7.62×39mm	Hungary	
Flint River Armory CSA45	Flint River Armory		.45 ACP	US	2017
FS2000	FN Herstal		5.56×45mm NATO	BEL	1995
FN FAL	FN Herstal		7.62×51mm NATO	BEL	1953
FN FNAR	FN Herstal		7.62×51mm NATO	BEL	2008
FN Model 1949	FN Herstal		.30-06 Springfield; 7.92×57mm Mauser; 7×57mm Mauser; 7.62×51mm NATO; 7.65×53mm Argentine	BEL	1947
PS90	FN Herstal		FN 5.7×28mm	BEL	2005
Farquhar–Hill rifle			.303 British	UK	1908
Fort Ellis XR86	Fort Ellis, Abingdon Pennsylvania		5.56×45mm NATO	US	1986
Frommer semiautotic rifle	Rudolf Frommer				
Fusil Automatique Modèle 1917	Manufacture Nationale d'Armes de Tulle(MAT) for Mle 1917; Manufacture d'armes de Saint-Étienne(MAS) for Mle 1918.		8×50mmR Lebel	France	1917
General Liu rifle	Hanyang Arsenal; Pratt & Whitney Machine Tool		7.92×57mm Mauser	Republic of China (1912–49)	1914
German Sport Guns GSG-5	German Sport Guns GmbH		.22 LR	Germany	2007
Gewehr 41			7.92×57mm Mauser	Nazi Germany	1941
Gewehr 43			7.92×57mm Mauser	Nazi Germany	1943
Hakim Rifle	Ministry of Military Production, Factory 54		7.92×57mm Mauser	Egypt	1950s
Harris Gun Works M-96	Harris Gunworks		12.7×99mm NATO	US	1996
Heckler & Koch HK41	Heckler & Koch		7.62×51mm NATO	West Germany	1964
Heckler & Koch HK43	Heckler & Koch		5.56mm NATO.223 Remington	West Germany	1974
Heckler & Koch PSG1	Heckler & Koch		7.62×51mm NATO	West Germany	1968
Heckler & Koch SL6	Heckler & Koch		5.56mm NATO.223 Remington	Germany	1980s
Heckler & Koch SL7	Heckler & Koch		7.62x51 NATO.308 Winchester	Germany	1980s
Heckler & Koch SL8	Heckler & Koch		.223 Remington; 5.56×45mm NATO	Germany	1998
Heckler & Koch SLB 2000	Heckler & Koch		.308 Winchester	Germany	2000
Heckler & Koch SR9	Heckler & Koch		7.62×51mm NATO	Germany	1990
Hino Komuro M1904	Hino Komuro		6.5×50mmSR Arisaka	Japan	1904
Hi-Point carbine	Hi-Point Firearms		9×19mm Parabellum.40 S&W; 10mm Auto.45 ACP.380 ACP	US	1990s
Howa Type 64	Howa		7.62×51mm NATO	Japan	1964
Howard Francis machine carbine			7.63×25mm Mauser	UK	
Howell Automatic Rifle			.303 British	UK	1915
Itajubá Model 954 Mosquetão	IMBEL		7x57 Mauser	Brazil	
Johnson Model 1936			.30-06 Springfield	United States	1936
KAL1 General Purpose Infantry Rifle	Small Arms Factory Lithgow		7.62×51mm NATO	Australia	1970
Kbsp wz. 1938M			7.92×57mm Mauser	Poland	1934
Kel-Tec RFB	Kel-Tec		7.62×51mm NATO	US	2003
Kel-Tec SU-16	Kel-Tec		5.56×45mm NATO.223 Remington	US	2000s
Kel-Tec SUB-2000	Kel-Tec		9×19mm Parabellum.40 S&W	US	2001
Komodo Armament D7 PMR SA	PT Komodo Armament Indonesia		7.62×51mm NATO	IDN	2014
Krnka-Hirtenberg			8×50mmR	Austria-Hungary	1908
L1A1 Self-Loading Rifle	Royal Small Arms Factory		7.62×51mm NATO	UK	1947
M110 Semi-Automatic Sniper System	Knight's Armament Company		7.62×51mm NATO	US	2007
M1903 Springfield primer actuacted prototype			.30-06 Springfield	US	1921
M1903 Springfield headspace operated prototype			.30-06 Springfield	US	
M1916 Kalashnikov automatic rifle	Sestroretsk plant		7.62x54mmR	Russian Empire	1916
M1941 Johnson rifle			.30-06 Springfield; 7×57mm Mauser (Chilean variant).270 Winchester	US	1941
M1922 Bang rifle			.30-06 Springfield; 6.5×55mm Swedish	United States	1922
M1947 Johnson auto carbine			.30-06 Springfield	US	1947
M1 carbine			.30 carbine	US	1942
M1 Garand			.30-06 Springfield (7.62×63mm); 7.62×51mm NATO (.308 Winchester) (Postwar use by U.S.Navy)	US	1934
Sjögren rifle			.30 Caliber	Sweden	1908
Springfield Armory M1A	Springfield Armory		7.62×51mm NATO (.308 Winchester), 6.5mm Creedmoor	US	1954
Stamm-Zeller 1902	Hans Stamm			CH	1902
Standard Arms Model G	Standard Arms		.25 Remington.30 Remington.32 Remington.35 Remington	US	1909
M21 Sniper Weapon System	Rock Island Arsenal; Springfield Armory		7.62×51mm NATO	US	1968
M25 Sniper Weapon System	Springfield Armory		.308 Winchester	US	1991
M39 Enhanced Marksman Rifle	Sage International		7.62×51mm NATO	US	2008
M89SR sniper rifle	Technical Consultants International		7.62×51mm NATO	Israel	1980s
Madsen M1888	Dansk Rekyl Riffel Syndikat A/S		8×58mmR Danish Krag	DNK	1888
Madsen M1896	Dansk Rekyl Riffel Syndikat A/S		8×58mmR Danish Krag.30-30 Winchester	DNK	1896
Marine Scout Sniper Rifle	Philippine Marine Corps		5.56×45mm NATO	PHL	1996
Mannlicher M1893 self-loading rifle	Ferdinand Mannlicher		8x50mmR	Austria-Hungary	1893
Mannlicher 1901/04 carbine	Ferdinand Mannlicher		7.63×32mm Mannlicher	Austria-Hungary	1901
Marlin Camp carbine	Marlin Firearms Company		.45 ACP; 9×19mm Parabellum	US	1985
Marlin Model 60	Marlin Firearms Company		.22 LR	US	1960
Marlin Model 70P	Marlin Firearms Company		.22 LR	US	
Marlin Model 795	Marlin Firearms Company		.22 LR	US	
MAS-49 rifle	Manufacture d'armes de Saint-Étienne		7.5×54mm French.308 (Century Arms mass conversions)	France	1949
Meunier rifle			7x59 "7mm Meunier"	France	1900s
Mauser M1902	Mauser			German Empire	1902
Mauser M1913 Selbstladegewehr	Mauser		9mm caliber round, conjecture: 9x57mm	German Empire	1913
Mauser M1916	Mauser		7.92×57mm Mauser	German Empire	1916
MICOR Leader 50	MICOR Defence		.50 BMG	US	2012
Mk. 12 Special Purpose Rifle			5.56×45mm NATO	US	2002
Mk. 14 Enhanced Battle Rifle	Naval Surface Warfare Center Crane Smith Enterprise, Inc. Sage International		7.62×51mm NATO	US	2001
Mondragón rifle	Schweizerische Industrie Gesellschaft		7×57mm Mauser; 7.92×57mm Mauser; 7.5×55mm Swiss	Mexico	1887
Mossberg 702 Plinkster	O.F. Mossberg & Sons		.22 LR	Brazil	2003
Mossberg 715T	O.F. Mossberg & Sons		.22 LR	US	2010
MTB 1925			6.5×52mm Carcano	Kingdom of Italy	1925
Noreen BN30	Noreen		.30-06 Springfield	US	2010s
Norinco JW-20	Norinco		.22 LR	China	
Norinco NHM 91	Norinco		7.62×39mm	China	1990s
Padovan 12.7mm	Jerko Padovan, Korcula		.50 BMG	Croatia	1990s
Pauza P-50	Pauza Specialties		.50 BMG	US	1991
Pedersen rifle			.276 Pederson	US	1920s
Pindad SP-1	PT Pindad (Persero)		7.62×51mm NATO	IDN	1970s
Pindad SS1-C	PT Pindad (Persero)		5.56×45mm NATO	IDN	1991
Pindad SS3	PT Pindad (Persero)		7.62×51mm NATO	IDN	2014
Pindad SPM 1	PT Pindad (Persero)		5.56×45mm NATO	IDN	2018
Preetz Model 65			.22 LR	West Germany	1965
PSL (rifle)	Fabrica de Arme Cugir SA (ROMARM consortium)		7.62×54mmR	Romania	1974
PTR 91F	Heckler & Koch, PTR Industries		7.62×51mm NATO.308 Winchester	US	2000
QBU-88	Norinco		5.8×42mm DBP87 (with non-standard loading); 5.56×45mm NATO (KBU-97A export variant)	China	1997
QBU-10	Norinco		12.7×108mm	China	2010
Rasheed carbine	Ministry of Military Production, Factory 54		7.62×39mm	Egypt	1950s
Remington Model Four	Remington Arms		.243 Winchester; 6mm Remington.270 Winchester.280 Remington.30-06 Springfield.308 Winchester	US	1981
Remington Model 8	Remington Arms		.25 Remington.30 Remington.32 Remington.35 Remington.300 Savage	US	1905
Remington Model 24	Remington Arms		.22 LR	US	1922
Remington Model 522 Viper	Remington Arms		.22 LR	US	1993
Remington Model 552	Remington Arms		.22 Short.22 Long.22 LR	US	1957
Remington Model 597	Remington Arms		.22 LR.22 WMR.17 HMR	US	1997
Remington Model 740	Remington Arms		.244 Remington.280 Remington.308 Winchester.30-06 Springfield	US	1955
Remington Model 742	Remington Arms		.243 Winchester; 6mm Remington.280 Remington.30-06 Springfield.308 Winchester	US	1960
Remington Model 7400	Remington Arms		6mm Remington.243 Winchester.270 Winchester; 7mm Remington Express.280 Remington.30-06 Springfield.308 Winchester.35 Whelen	US	1981
Remington Nylon 66	Remington Arms		.22 LR	US	1959
Remington Semi Automatic Sniper System	Remington Arms		7.62 NATO	US	2010
Rieder Automatic Rifle			.303 British	South Africa	1941
Robinson Armament M96 Expeditionary	Robinson Armament Co.		5.56×45mm NATO	US	1999
Ruger 10/17	Sturm, Ruger & Co.		.17 HMR	US	1964
Ruger 10/22	Sturm, Ruger & Co.		.22 LR.22 Magnum	US	1964
Ruger Deerfield carbine	Sturm, Ruger & Co.		.44 Magnum	US	2000
Ruger Mini-14	Sturm, Ruger & Co.		.223 Remington; 5.56×45mm.300 AAC Blackout	US	1967
Ruger Mini-30	Sturm, Ruger & Co.		7.62×39mm	US	1987
Ruger Model 44	Sturm, Ruger & Co.		.44 Remington Magnum	US	1960
Ruger police carbine	Sturm, Ruger & Co.		9×19mm Parabellum.40 S&W	US	1996
Ruger SR-556 Ruger AR-556	Sturm, Ruger & Co.		5.56×45mm NATO/.223 Remington.300 AAC Blackout; 6.8mm Remington SPC.308 Winchester/7.62×51mm NATO (SR-762 only)	US	2009
Ruger XGI	Sturm, Ruger & Co.		.308 Winchester.243 Winchester	US	1984
Saiga semi-automatic rifle	Kalashnikov Concern		7.62×39mm	RUS	1990s
Kalashnikov SR-1	Kalashnikov Concern		5.56×45mm NATO.223 Remington	RUS	2018
Savage Model 64	Savage Arms		.22 LR	Canada	1964
Selbstlader Model 06	Georg Luger		7.92x57mm	German Empire	1906
Scotti Mod. X	Società Anonima Armi Automatiche Scotti		6.5×52mm Carcano	Italy	1932
Sheppard automatic rifle	U.S. Ordnance Co.		.30-06 Springfield	US	1914
SIG MCX	SIG Sauer		5.56×45mm NATO.300 AAC Blackout.277 Fury, 7.62x51mm 6.5 Creedmoor (MCX Spear)	CH	2010s
SIG Sauer SIGM400	SIG Sauer		5.56×45mm NATO.223 Remington.300 AAC Blackout	Germany	2000s
SIG Sauer SIG516 SIG716	SIG Sauer		5.56×45mm NATO; 7.62x39mm (SIG516); 7.62×51mm NATO; 6.5 Creedmoor (SIG716)	Germany	2010
SIG 522LR	SIG Sauer		.22 LR	Germany	2009
SIG550-1	Swiss Arms AG		5.56x45mm NATO	Switzerland	1988
SIG 556	SIG Sauer		5.56x45mm NATO	US	
SIG750	Swiss Arms AG		6.5mm Creedmoor	Switzerland	2004
Silver Shadow Gilboa Snake	Silver Shadow		5.56×45mm NATO	Israel	2015
SKS			7.62×39mm	Soviet Union	1945
Smith & Wesson M&P10	Smith & Wesson		.308 Winchester; 7.62×51mm NATO	US	2013
Smith & Wesson M&P15	Smith & Wesson		5.56×45mm NATO.223 Remington	US	2006
Smith & Wesson M&P15-22	Smith & Wesson		.22 LR	US	2009
Springfield 1903 Primer-Actuated Rifle	Springfield Armoury		.30-06 Springfield	US	1903
Springfield Armoury SAR-8 Heavy Barrel Counter Sniper Rifle	Springfield Armoury		7.62x51mm NATO	US	1995
Spuhr R-8000 ERS	Spuhr i Dalby AB		7.62x51mm NATO	Sweden	2019
SR-25	Knight's Armament Company		7.62×51mm NATO	US	1990
Steyr M1911	Steyr		7×57mm Mauser	Austria	1911
Steyr-DMR 762	Steyr Mannlicher		7.62x51mm NATO	Austria	2023
Steyr IWS 2000	Steyr Mannlicher		15.2x169mm	Austria	1980s
STK SSW (firearm)	STK		5.7×28mm	Singapore	
Sturmgewehr 58	Fabrique Nationale de Herstal		7.62×51mm NATO	BEL	1958
SVT-40			7.62×54mmR	Soviet Union	1940
T-62 Civilian Defense Rifle	Armalite		.22 LR	US	1962
Tabuk Sniper Rifle	Al-Qadissiya Establishments		7.62×39mm	Iraq	1970s
Terry carbine	Wilkinson Arms		9×19mm Parabellum	US	1970
Thompson Autorifle	Auto-Ordnance Company		.30-06 Springfield; 7.62×54mmR (1923 model)	US	1921
Turner automatic rifle	Russel Turner		.303 British	US	1941
Type Hei Rifle	Kokura Arsenal		6.5×50mmSR Arisaka	Empire of Japan	1932
Type Kō Rifle	Kokura Arsenal		6.5×50mmSR Arisaka	Empire of Japan	1933
Type 4 rifle	Yokosuka Naval Arsenal		7.7×58mm Arisaka	Empire of Japan	1944
United States Marine Corps Designated Marksman Rifle			7.62×51mm NATO	US	2001
Urutau			9x19 Parabellum	Brazil	2021
Volkssturmgewehr			7.92×33mm Kurz	Nazi Germany	1944
Vulcan V18			5.56×45mm NATO	US	1991
Vz. 52 rifle	Považské strojárne Česká zbrojovka		7.62×45mm (vz. 52); 7.62×39mm (vz. 52/57)	CZ	1952
Walther G22	Walther		.22 LR	Germany	
Walther WA 2000	Walther		7.62×51mm NATO.300 Winchester Magnum; 7.5×55mm Swiss	West Germany	1982
WASR-series rifles	Cugir Arms Factory		7.62×39mm 5.45x39mm 5.56x45mm NATO	Romania	
Winchester Model 1903	Winchester Repeating Arms Company		.22 Winchester Automatic	US	1903
Winchester Model 1905	Winchester Repeating Arms Company		.32 Winchester Self-Loading.35 Winchester Self-Loading	US	1905
Winchester Model 1907	Winchester Repeating Arms Company		.351 Winchester Self-Loading	US	1907
Winchester Model 1910	Winchester Repeating Arms Company		.401 Winchester Self-Loading	US	1910
Winchester model 30	Winchester Repeating Arms Company		.30-06 Springfield	US	1939
Xiangying rifle	Jin-Sui District Arsenal No.2		6.5x50mm Arisaka	Republic of China (1912–49)	1944
Zastava M76	Zastava Arms		7.92×57mm Mauser	Yugoslavia	1976
Zastava M91	Zastava Arms		7.62×54mmR	Yugoslavia	1991
ZH-29	Ceskoslovenska Zbrojovka		7.92×57mm Mauser	CZ	1929
Zijiang M99	Zinjiang Machinery Company		12.7×108mm	China	2005

== See also ==
- List of firearms
- List of assault rifles
- List of battle rifles
- List of bullpup firearms
- List of carbines
- List of Colt AR-15 & M16 rifle variants
- List of machine guns
- List of multiple-barrel firearms
- List of pistols
- List of revolvers
- List of semi-automatic firearms
  - List of semi-automatic pistols
  - List of semi-automatic shotguns
- List of shotguns
- List of sniper rifles
- List of submachine guns
- List of anti-materiel rifles
