= MBT =

MBT may refer to:

== Armaments ==
- Main battle tank
- MBT 1925, an Italian rifle
- MBT (missile balistique terrestre), planned French nuclear ballistic missile

== Businesses ==
- Manitoba Telecom Services, traded as MBT on the TSX
- MTS (network provider), traded as MBT on the NYSE
- Masai Barefoot Technology, a brand of rocker bottom shoes
- Massachusetts business trust, United States, a type of business
- Tech Mahindra (formerly Mahindra British Telecom)
- Metropolitan Bank and Trust Company, Philippines, a bank
- Monroe Bank & Trust, a holding company in Michigan, United States

== Places (including buildings etc.) ==
- The National Rail code for Marsh Barton railway station in the Marsh Barton area of Exeter, England
- Mont Blanc Tunnel, between France and Italy
- Mount Baker Theatre, Bellingham, Washington, US
- Mountbatten MRT station, Singapore
- Moises R. Espinosa Airport, Philippines (IATA code)
- Murfreesboro Municipal Airport, Tennessee, United States (FAA LID code)
- Metropolitan Branch Trail, a hiking/cycling route, north-east United States

== Science and technology ==
=== Biology and medicine ===
- Malignant brain tumor
- Mentalization-based treatment
- Methylbutyltryptamine, a lesser-known psychedelic drug
- Midblastula transition in embryonic development
- Mind-body training, such as yoga, tai chi and Pilates

=== Other uses in science and technology ===
- Main Boundary Thrust, Himalayas, a geologic fault
- Maximum brake torque, a tuning setting at which an engine achieves maximum torque
- Model-based testing, a software testing approach
- 3-Methyl-2-butene-1-thiol, a compound sometimes found in beer that is similar in chemical composition and odor to the spray of a skunk
- Mechanical biological treatment, for sewage
- Mercaptobenzothiozole, used as an accelerant in vulcanisation processes

== Other uses ==
- Majlis Bachao Tehreek, a political party in the Indian state of Telangana
- Manitoba Standard Time, a timezone used in Manitoba, Canada
- Manufacturing Business Technology, a website
- Master of Business Taxation, an academic qualification
- The Monster Ball Tour, 2009–2011 Lady Gaga world tour
- MBT (board game), a wargame involving tanks
- Matigsalug language of Mindanao
- Modified Brussels Treaty of 1954, a mutual defence agreement between European countries
- McLeod Bethel-Thompson, American football quarterback for the New Orleans Breakers
