= Remington Model 241 =

Remington 241
- Type: Autoloading rimfire rifle
- Place of origin: US

Production history
- Designer: John Browning
- Produced: 1935–1949
- No. built: 107,345

Specifications
- Mass: 6 lb (2.7 kg)
- Barrel length: 24 in (61 cm)
- Cartridge: .22 Short, .22 Long Rifle
- Feed system: 15 (Short) or 10 (Long) in a tubular magazine
- Sights: Open rear, bead front.

The Remington Arms Model 241 Speedmaster, an autoloading rimfire rifle, was manufactured from 1935 to 1951 from a John Browning design. Remington reports that 107,345 rifles were manufactured in .22 Short or .22 Long Rifle. A similar rifle is currently being sold by Browning Arms Company (the Browning SA-22 Browning 22 Semi-Auto rifle).

The Remington Model 241 (and indeed all the semi-automatic .22 rifles based on John Browning's design) is a takedown design in which the barrel can be easily separated from the receiver to shorten the rifle's length for ease in transporting.

When Remington brought out the Model 241 in 1935 it replaced the Model 24 which, although of slightly smaller size (and having a few other differences), was also based on John Browning's semi-automatic .22 rifle design.

The Remington Model 241 is very similar to the Browning SA-22 with the significant difference being the way in which the barrels are adjusted so that they fit snuggly against the receivers when the rifles are fully assembled. This barrel tightening feature is made necessary due to their takedown designs (a means must be provided so that the barrel is sufficiently tight when coupled to the receiver and yet not so tight as to make disengaging the barrel from the receiver overly difficult).

Whereas the Browning SA-22's barrel tightening is accomplished with an adjusting ring at the base of the barrel (and can easily be seen) where it butts up against the receiver - the Remington Model 241's barrel tightening mechanism uses a dual-sided nut (with an interrupted-screw thread in the interior and a full thread cut into the exterior) riding inside the threaded hole in the front of the receiver (only visible when the barrel is separated from the receiver). Selecting how deeply the dual-sided nut sits in the receiver (with the dual-sided nut's exterior thread meshing with the thread cut into the hole in the front of the receiver) controls how tightly the barrel fits against the receiver when it is attached (the rifle is assembled).

Persons wishing to make adjustments to the Model 241's barrel tightening mechanism must become familiar not only with the use of the dual-sided nut (that fits in the hole in the front of the receiver) but also how that nut is locked in-place (so that it will not accidentally turn once it has been set as desired). What appears to be a flat blade screw head on the right side of the Model 241's receiver, that can easily be mistaken as a screw to lock the dual-sided nut in place, is actually a cosmetic affectation on what has sometimes been described as a 'slug' (instead of having threads on its sides as would a screw it has smooth sides). While the slug does indeed press (inside the receiver) against the outside of the dual-sided nut (and thus keeps the dual-sided nut from rotating) it does not have its pressure against the outside of the dual-sided nut adjusted by rotating (as it would were it a screw) but instead the slug is held pressing against the outside of the dual-sided nut by first being simply pushed against the outside of the dual-sided nut (by pressing down on the slug's flat blade screw head appearance on the right side of the receiver) and then a screw (the actual locking-screw) presses against the side of the slug (inside the receiver) and thus prevents it from moving. That locking-screw is oriented such that it comes in (to press against the side of the slug) from the direction of the front face of the receiver (and so is only visible when the barrel is separated from the receiver).

To adjust the Model 241's barrel tightness it is necessary to first loosen the dual-sided nut so that it can rotate and thus have its depth within the receiver changed. To loosen the dual-sided nut requires that the 'slug' pressing against it be loosened and to accomplish that the locking-screw (accessible from the face of the receiver when the barrel is removed) must be backed-out so that it isn't pressing against the slug. The slug is then jiggled (by a gentle rocking action on the false screw head of the exterior appearance of the slug - no attempt should be made to rotate the slug as if it were a screw as it has a machined appearance meshing with the outer threads of the dual-sided nut) and that will be sufficient so that the slug disengages (within the receiver) from the outside of the dual-sided nut (so the dual-sided nut is then free to be adjusted). The Model 241's elegant barrel tightening mechanism can be damaged if these steps are not followed.
