= M88 =

M88, M-88 or M/88 may refer to:

- M-88 (Michigan highway), a state highway in Michigan
- M/88, a rifle cartridge, adopted by Germany in 1888
- M88 Recovery Vehicle, a US tank recovery vehicle
- Beyerdynamic M88, a dynamic microphone
- BMW M88, an inline 6-cylinder piston engine
- Messier 88, a spiral galaxy in the constellation Coma Berenices
- Snecma M88, an afterburning turbofan engine developed for the Dassault Rafale fighter
- Tumansky M-88, an air-cooled radial aircraft engine
- Zastava M88, a semi-automatic handgun produced by Zastava Arms, Serbia
- A standard firecracker with extra packing, designed to resemble an M-80 explosive
- M-88 Long Range Sniper Rifle, a sniper rifle adopted by the US Navy
- M88, now KLYT, a noncommercial Christian radio station in New Mexico
