= L67A1 Riot Gun =

British experimental 1.5-inch breech-loading riot gun

L67A1 Riot gun

Enfield L67A1 is an 1.5-inch breech-loading riot gun prototype produced at the Royal Small Arms Factory (RSAF) in Enfield, Britain.

== History ==
The L67A1 prototype was developed at RSAF Enfield as part of an experimental programme to explore new designs for riot control weapons. It was produced in the early stages of this development and was part of a broader effort to advance non-lethal crowd control technology.

== Design ==
The L67A1 features:

- Calibre: 1.5 inches
- Overall: Length: 710 mm
- Overall: Weight: 2 kg

The weapon was designed as a breech-loading system, allowing for potentially rapid reloading and versatile use in crowd control scenarios. Its design included a rifled barrel liner to improve accuracy.

== Production ==
The Enfield L67A1 was produced in 1988 by RSAF Enfield.

== See also ==
- Riot control weapons
- Royal Small Arms Factory
- The Troubles
