= RSAF =

The acronym RSAF may refer to:

- Republic of Singapore Air Force
- Royal Saudi Air Force
- Royal Small Arms Factory, a defunct rifle factory in the United Kingdom
- Republic of South Africa Air Force
