= V18 =

V18 or V-18 may refer to:

- De Havilland Canada V-18, a utility transport aircraft
- ITU-T V.18, a textphone protocol
- LFG V 18 Sassnitz, a German flying boat
- V18 engine, an internal combustion engine
- Vulcan V18, a rifle
- V18, a family history of certain other specific conditions, in the ICD-9 V codes
