= Norinco JW-20 =

Semi-automatic rifle

The Norinco JW-20 is a semi-automatic rifle produced by Norinco based on the Browning 22 Semi-Auto rifle.
