= Takedown gun =

Type of firearm

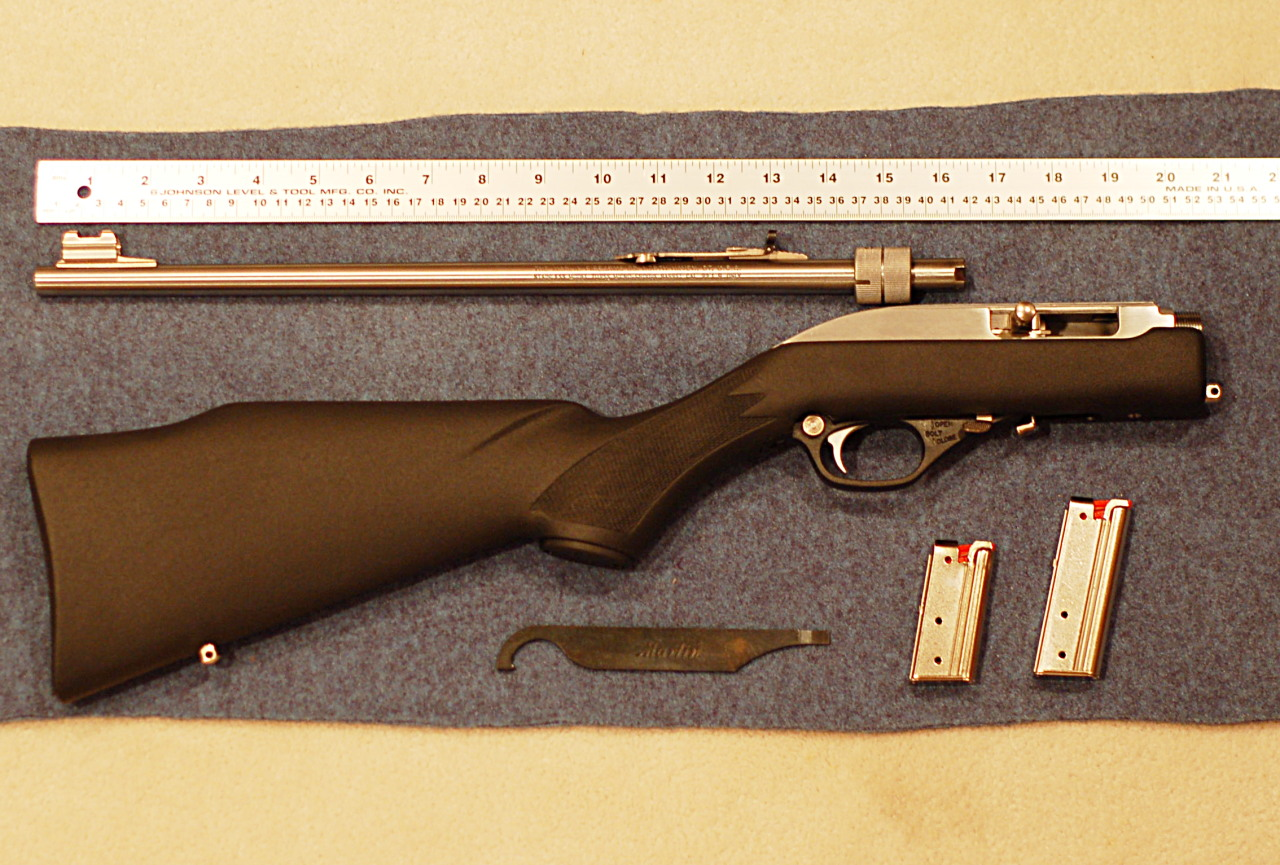
2008 Marlin Model 70PSS, disassembled, with ruler for scale

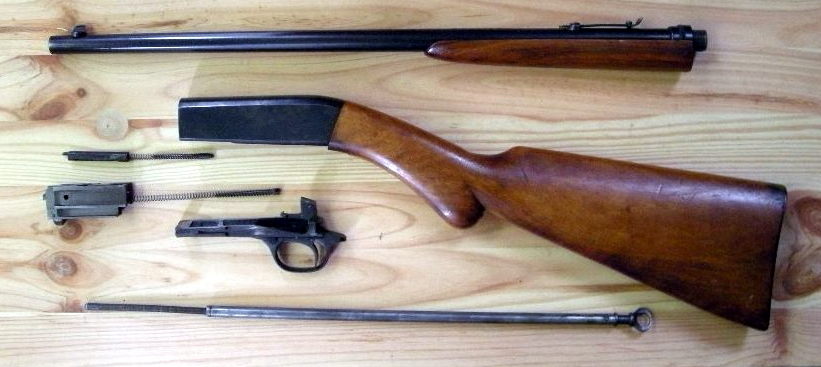
FN Browning SA-22 takedown rifle disassembled

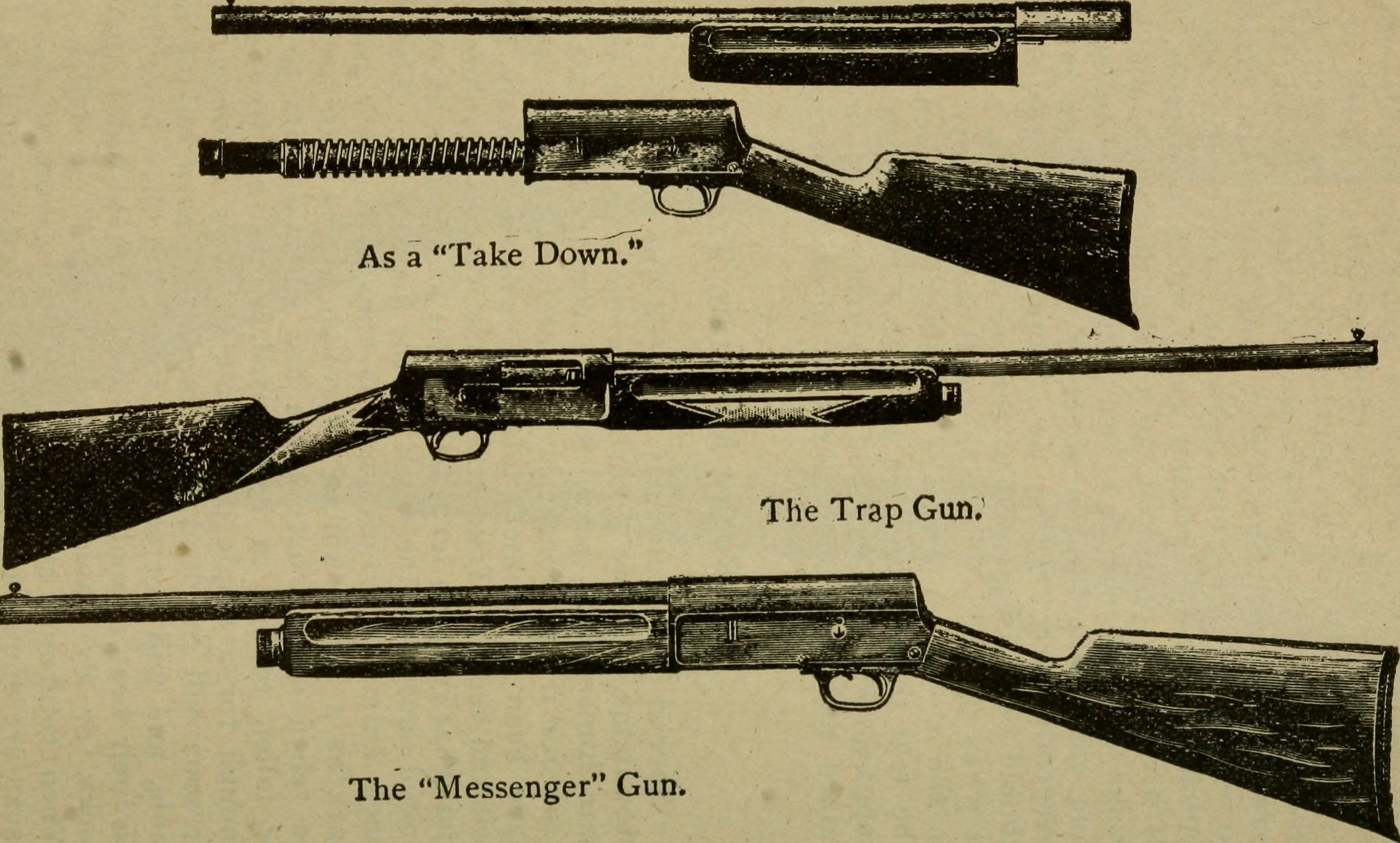
Takedown semi-automatic shotgun from Buzzacott's Masterpiece

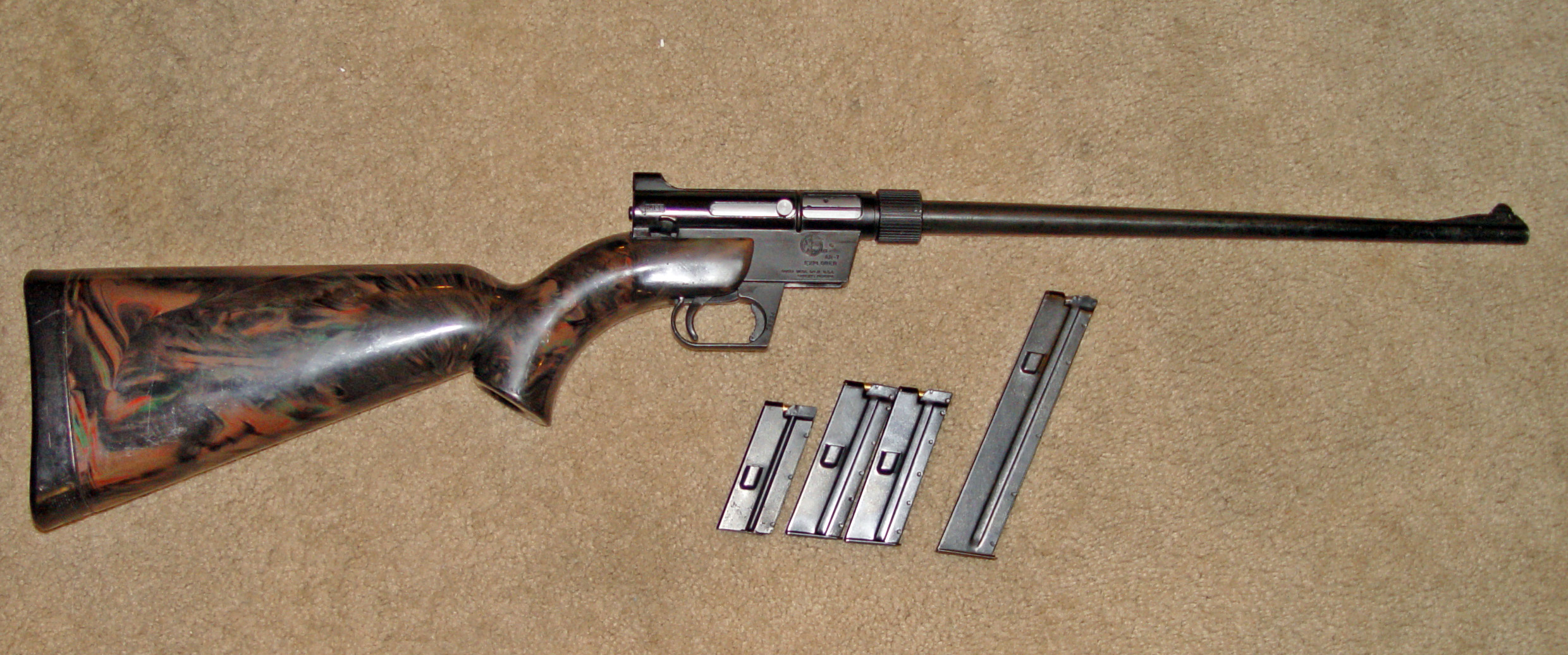
ArmaLite AR-7 survival takedown rifle with magazines

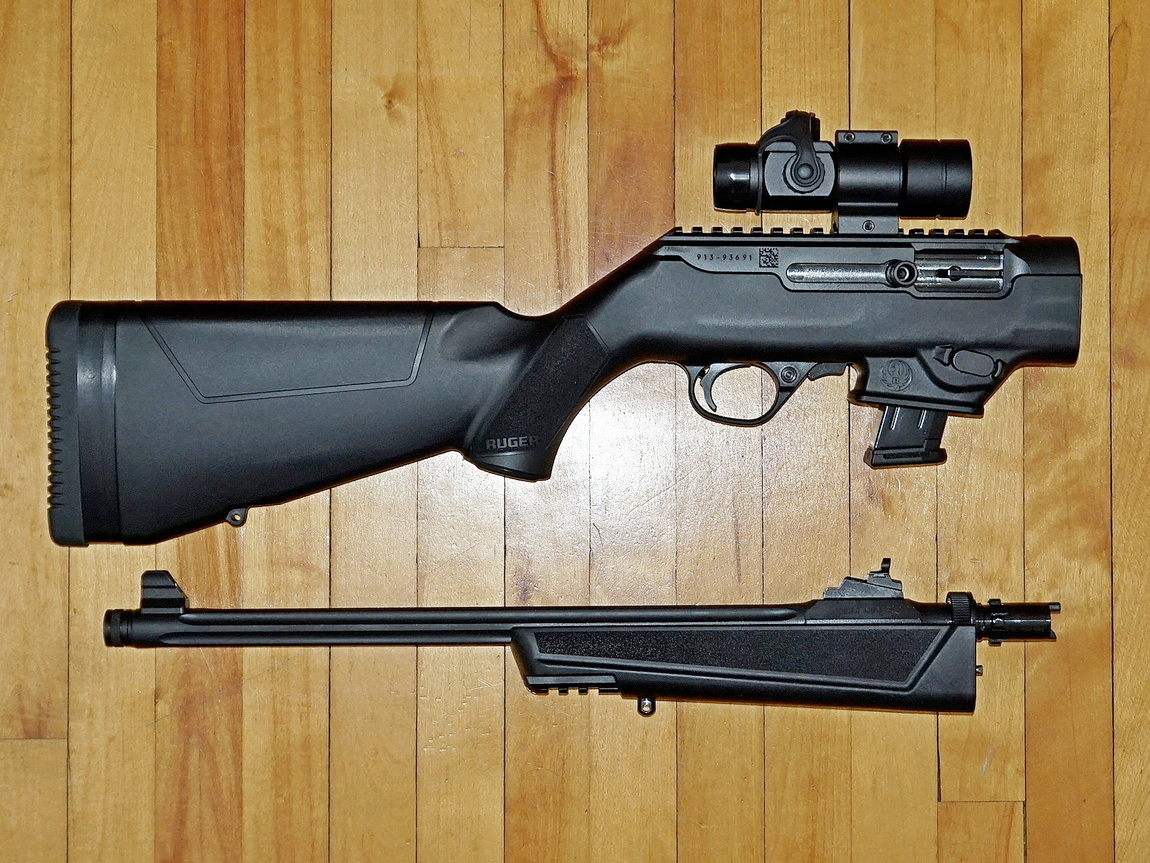
Ruger PC Carbine 9mm takedown rifle disassembled

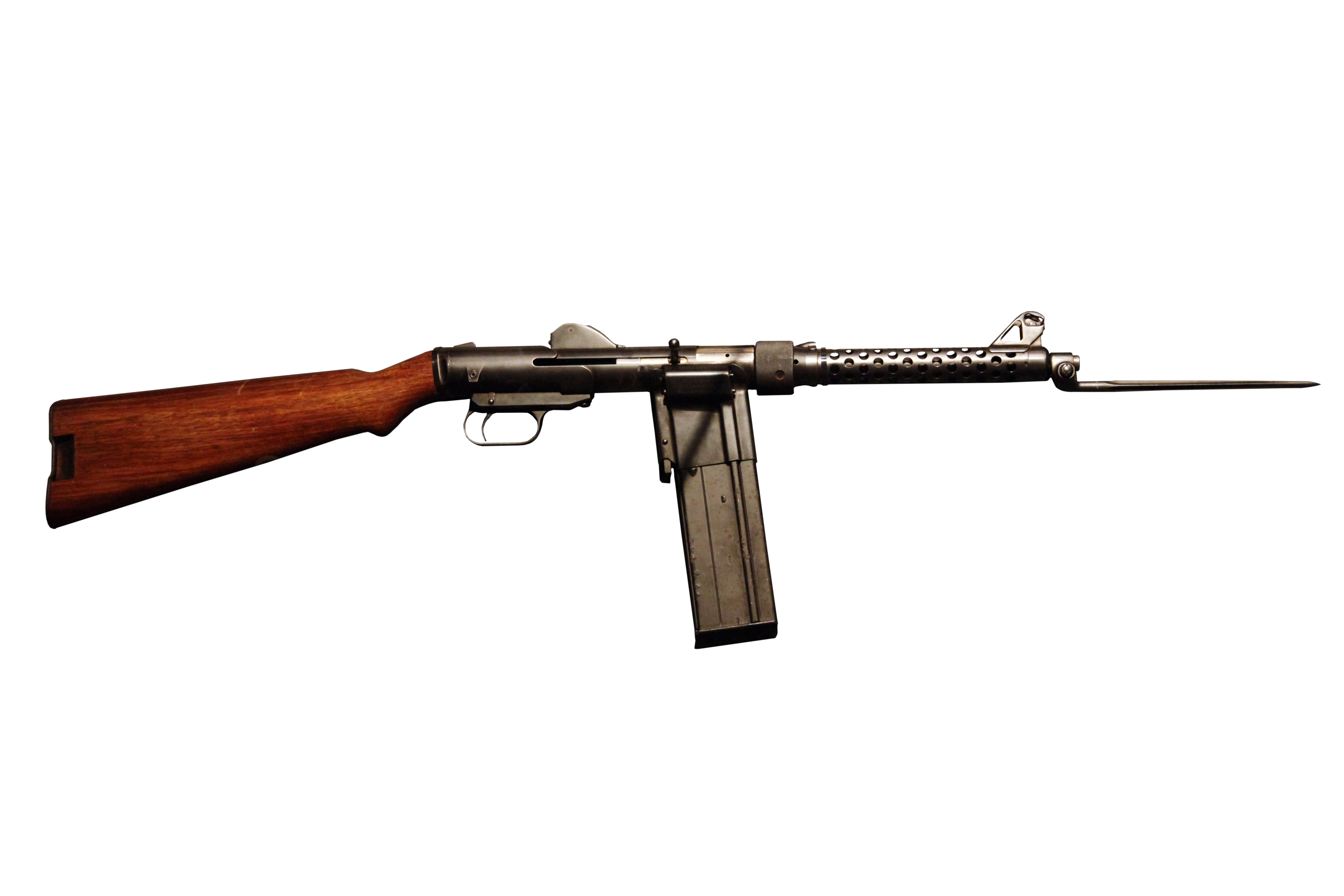
VAP submachine gun

A takedown gun (typically a takedown rifle or takedown shotgun) is a long gun designed to be taken apart, significantly reducing its length, making it easier to store, pack, transport, and conceal. A variety of barrel, stock, and receiver designs have been invented to facilitate takedown. For example, the hinged design of many break-action firearms allows takedown. Some regular firearms can be modified to allow takedown after custom gunsmithing.

== Rifles ==
American gun manufacturers including Marlin, Ruger, Savage, and Winchester have made takedown rifles since the late 19th century. Some early examples include the Browning 22 Semi-Auto rifle, Remington Model 24, Remington Model 8, Winchester Model 86, and Winchester Model 94 by Fabrique Nationale, Remington Arms, and Winchester Repeating Arms Company. Many militaries in the early 20th century also experimented with takedown systems, particularly for the use by paratroopers. An example of this is the Japanese experimental TERA Rifles. A more modern example of a takedown rifle is the DRD Tactical Paratus, a Clandestine Break-Down Rifle (CSR) requested by the Joint & Special Operations Program (JSOP).

== Machine guns ==
The AA-52 machine gun has takedown capabilities. The Ohio Ordnance Works REAPR (Recoil Enhanced Automatic Precision Rifle) has a takedown capability that can take around 20 seconds.

== Shotguns ==
Most single-barrel and double-barrel shotguns readily break down to separate the buttstock and action from the barrel and forend and are often transported cased as takedown guns. Among repeating shotguns, the Winchester Model 97 and Model 12 shotguns were factory-made as takedown guns. Savage also makes a series of takedown over/under rifle/shotgun combination guns.

== Submachine guns ==
Submachine guns, usually used for clandestine warfare such as the Patchett machine carbine, MCEM 3 submachine gun, MGD PM-9, Hotchkiss Type Universal, and UC-9 have takedown capabilities. A semi automatic carbine exists as the Stemple takedown gun manufactured by the BRP Corp.

== Survival guns ==
Survival guns such as the ArmaLite AR-7 may be disassembled and their barrel, action, and magazines stored within its plastic butt-stock. This lightweight 2.5 lb (1.1 kg), .22 caliber (5.6 mm), semi-automatic rifle measures 35 inches (89 cm) overall when assembled, 16 inches (41 cm) when disassembled, and can even float. Although the AR-7 was designed as a pilot and aircrew survival weapon, it is commonly used by target shooters and backpackers and is frequently stowed away in vehicles and boats.

== See also ==
- Glossary of firearms terms
- Poacher's gun, the 18th century precursor to the takedown rifle.
