= Type 4 rifle =

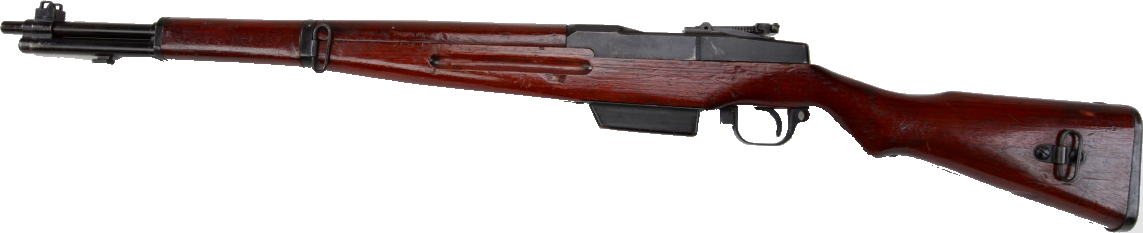
- Type 4 semi-automatic rifle
- Type: Semi-automatic rifle
- Place of origin: Japan

Service history
- Used by: Imperial Japanese Navy

Production history
- Designed: 1944
- Manufacturer: Yokosuka Naval Arsenal
- Produced: 1945
- No. built: Parts for ~200, ~125 complete rifles

Specifications
- Mass: 4.097 kg (9.03 lb)
- Length: 1,073 mm (42.2 in)
- Barrel length: 590 mm (23 in)
- Cartridge: 7.7×58mm Arisaka
- Action: Gas-operated, rotating bolt
- Muzzle velocity: 840 m/s (2,800 ft/s)
- Feed system: 10-round internal box magazine loaded via two 5-round stripper clips
- Sights: Iron

The Type 4 rifle, often referred to as the Type 5 rifle, (Japanese: 四式自動小銃 Yon-shiki Jidōshōju) was a Japanese semi-automatic rifle. It was based on the American M1 Garand with an integral 10-round magazine and chambered for the Japanese 7.7×58mm Arisaka cartridge. Where the Garand used an 8-round en-bloc clip, the Type 4's integral magazine was charged with two 5-round stripper clips and the rifle also used Japanese-style tangent sights.

The Type 4 rifle had been developed alongside several other semi-automatic rifles. However, none of the rifles entered into service before the end of World War II, with only 250 being made, and many others were never assembled. There were several problems with jamming and feed systems, which also delayed its testing.

== History ==
Japan had experimented with semi-automatic rifles in the 1930s, when the Imperial Japanese Navy tested rifles based on the Czechoslovakia ZH-29. They were cancelled in the end due to problems encountered during testing.

During the Second World War, Japanese soldiers relied on bolt-action type rifles. However, guns were getting scarce and their main military opponent, the United States, had replaced their bolt weapons with modern semi-automatic rifles.

At the same time, Nazi Germany and the Soviet Union were also developing their own semi-automatic weapons, such as the Russian SVT-40 and German Gewehr 43, which would give them a great advantage on the battlefield. Even Italy used its own semi-automatic weapon, the Armaguerra Mod. 39 rifle. This pressured Japan to find a quick way to cope with their military disadvantage. Instead of designing and investing in a new weapon from scratch, they opted to copy the American M1 Garand.

Initially, the Japanese experimented with re-chambering captured American M1 rifles, since the 7.7×58mm Arisaka Japanese cartridge has similar dimensions to the .30-06 Springfield cartridge. They found that while the Garand could chamber, fire, and cycle with the 7.7×58mm Arisaka ammunition, the 8-round en-bloc clip system was incompatible with the new rifle cartridge and would not feed reliably. Instead the Japanese designers reverse engineered the M1 Garand and discarded the 8-round en-bloc clip, replacing it with a fixed internal 10-round magazine charged by two 5-round Arisaka Type 99 stripper clips.

Japan had previously developed semi-automatic service rifles, such as the Type Hei, Type Kō and Type Otsu but none of them had been viewed as successful or of trustworthy quality. The design work for the Type 4 rifle began in 1944. According to Japanese researchers, the official designation for the rifle is Type 4. However, the rifle is often incorrectly referred to as the Type 5, possibly based on an erroneous American technical intelligence report published in 1946.

The Type 4 rifle was meant to be mass-produced in 1945. However, the Japanese were defeated in August of the same year, therefore the manufacturing process was indefinitely halted.

At the time, an estimate of 125 Type 4 rifles were completed out of the 250 in the workshop. Twenty of them were taken by the Allies at the Yokosuka Naval Arsenal on Honshu after the end of the war.

Examples of this rifle can be found at the National Firearms Museum in Fairfax County, Virginia, and the Royal Armouries in Leeds, United Kingdom.

== Variants ==
The following variants of the Type 4 rifle's were made:

- First Variant
- Second Variant
- Third Variant
- Pre-production Model
- Production Model
