= Norinco NHM 91 =

Semi-automatic infantry small arm

The NHM-91 is a semi-automatic civilian development of the Russian Kalashnikov AKM and RPK infantry small arm built by Norinco of China and marketed in the U.S. by China Sports Inc. of Ontario, California (CSI Ont, CA).

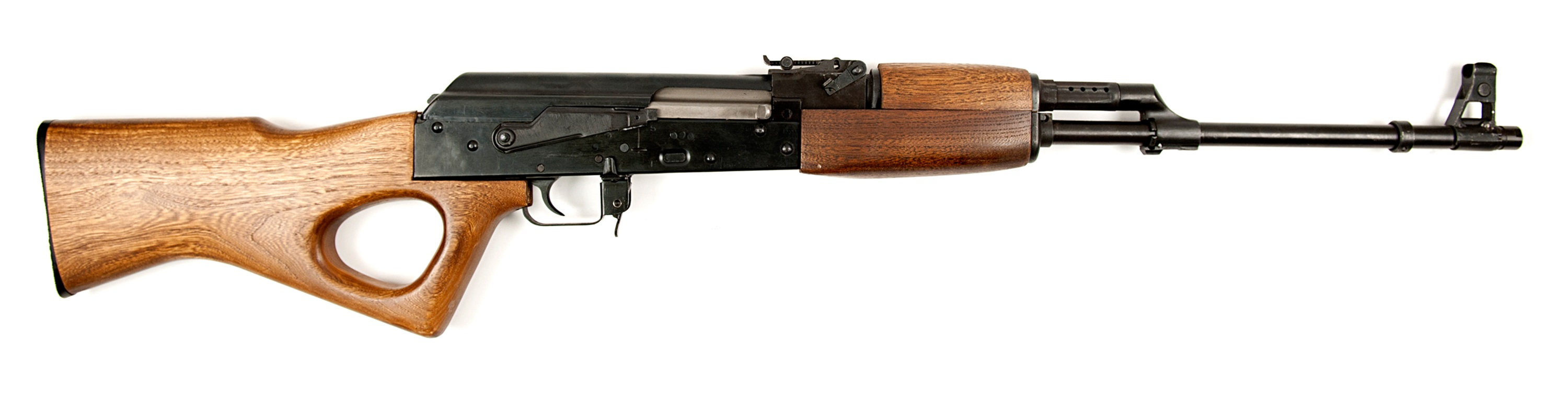
A Norinco NHM-91 with a thumbhole stock

== Background ==
A civilian semi-auto variant of the Chinese Type 56 assault rifle, the NHM-91 was built to imitate the appearance of the Russian RPK light machine gun. First imported and marketed in the United States in 1991 by ChinaSports Inc., NHM-91's were modified to meet the requirements of a 1989 Executive Order by President George H. W. Bush prohibiting importation of certain 'assault rifle' configurations of military-style semi-automatic rifles such as the Norinco AKM/AK-47. These modifications included a one-piece U.S.-made thumbhole stock to replace the separate Chinese-made buttstock and pistol grip of the original AKM/RPK rifle and the inclusion of a rivet on the receiver preventing use of standard AK-47, RPK, or AKM magazines. All Chinese rifles were banned under the 1994 Clinton administration or AWB Ban and no Chinese AK variants were allowed to be imported.

== Features ==
Based on the Russian RPK light machine gun, the NHM features a stronger receiver and a shorter, thicker-profile chrome-lined barrel measuring 20 inches (508mm) compared to the 590 mm (23.2 in) of the original RPK, along with a forward-mounted steel bipod. The NHM-91 was equipped from the factory with two 30-round magazines and a 75-round Chinese drum magazine.

Like the RPK, the NHM-91 utilizes a heavier-gauge stamped sheet metal receiver built from 1.5mm-thick stamped sheet metal instead of the 1mm thickness typical of a Soviet or European AKM. Other Chinese-made AKM rifles such as the MAK 90 and NHM 90 have thicker receivers as well, resulting in increased rigidity, heavier weight, and improved overall accuracy. The MAK 90 rifles may have either a straight cut stamped receiver or a slant cut stamped receiver. Both were imported after the 1989 ban with thumb hole stocks. The MAK 91 has the long barrel as well, but features a milled, slant cut receiver. The longer, heavier barrel reduces shot dispersion and gives the NHM-91 and MAK 91 rifles a longer sight radius, again resulting in improved accuracy over the typical semi-auto AKM. Trigger pull weight is also lighter than other AK designs, and some users report the rifle capable of 2-2.5 minutes of angle accuracy or better with factory 7.62×39mm ammunition.

All post ban rifle stocks on the NHM-91 are of a one-piece thumbhole design with integral pistol grip, and are thicker and longer than the standard AKM/AK-47 buttstock. Made by E.C. Bishop or Boyd and constructed from birch wood or hackberry, the NHM-91 buttstock lacks a separate pistol grip, though the rifle may be retrofitted with a separate buttstock by simply cutting off the lower portion of the stock and grip with a band saw, then fitting a new pistol grip. Additionally, due to the stipulations of the 1989 ban, the handguards are notably thicker and lack the typical ventilation ports as seen on most AKM/RPK platforms, as it was marketed as a target rifle despite the origins. Like its RPK counterpart, the NHM-91 does not come equipped from the factory with a bayonet lug. However, on post ban models, the front of the barrel is threaded and capped off with a thread protector welded onto the threads or the threads are deleted altogether. By removing the thread protector, a muzzle brake can be fitted.

Some factory NHM-91 rifles were manufactured with a rivet in the magazine release button, preventing use of some Soviet or German-made AKM or AK-47 magazines. Instead, special magazines with a modified tang were manufactured by Norinco for the NHM-91. Since the sunset of the 1994 Public Safety and Recreational Firearms Use Protection Act, removal of the rivet in the receiver and magazine release allows use of any and all AKM, RPK, or AK-47 magazines.
