= Type Hei Rifle =

- Type: Semi-automatic rifle
- Place of origin: Empire of Japan

Service history
- Used by: Japan
- Wars: Second Sino-Japanese War; World War II

Production history
- Designer: Masaya Kawamura
- Designed: 1932
- Manufacturer: Kokura Arsenal
- Produced: 1932–1935
- No. built: 50

Specifications
- Mass: 8.59 lb (3.90 kg)
- Length: 42.0 in (107 cm)
- Barrel length: 23.0 in (58 cm)
- Cartridge: 6.5x50mm Arisaka
- Caliber: 6.5mm
- Action: Gas-operated, toggle-locked
- Feed system: 5–10 round box magazine
- Sights: Adjustable aperture sight

The Type Hei (Japanese: 試製自動小銃丙, Hepburn: Shisei jidō shōjū hei; lit. "Experimental Automatic Rifle Hei") or Automatic Rifle Type C was a Japanese self-loading rifle that was produced in limited numbers by Nippon Special Steel.

== History ==
The Type Hei rifle was one of three self-loading rifle designs commissioned by the Imperial Japanese Army for military trials. It was designed by Dr. Masaya Kawamura and produced at the Nippon Special Steel company. The first prototypes were constructed in 1932 and it is estimated that around 50 models were made. The trials took place in 1935. The Type Hei Rifle was tested alongside the Type Kō Rifle and the Type Otsu Rifle, however none of the rifles tested were considered suitable for service. On top of that the projected costs were too high to justify a full production run, so the project was cancelled. The Type Hei was a toggle-action self-loading rifle that derived its action from the Pedersen rifle, modified to utilize a basic gas piston to unlock the bolt.

== Design ==
Early prototypes of the Type Hei used a detachable 5-round magazine, whereas later models had an extended 10-round capacity. Both magazines could be reloaded through Arisaka stripper clips or by detaching the magazine. The magazine catch was located in front of the trigger, within the trigger guard. The rear sight was an adjustable aperture and could be graduated from 300 – 1500 meters. Type Hei used a toggle-delayed blowback system similar to one used in American Pedersen rifle, but with smaller recoil. Type Hei had two variants—42 inches long carbine that weighted 7.49 pounds and a full-lenght rifle that was almost 44 inches long and weighted 8.8 pounds.

== Service ==
The adoption of the rifle was postponed by the outbreak of the Second Sino-Japanese War. During World War II, the small numbers of Type Hei rifles that were available were allegedly pressed into service and some were captured by US troops in the Pacific Theater.

== Fully automatic prototype ==
Kawamura also developed a fully-automatic variant of the Type Hei rifle with an extended 20-round magazine and a gun shield. This version was called Experimental Ultra Light Machine Gun (Japanese: 試製超軽機関銃, Shisei Chō Kei Kikanjū). It was chambered in 6.5×50mmSR Arisaka like the regular Type Hei rifle. This variant was tested in 1938, but adoption was rejected due to low reliability and too high rate of fire.

== See also ==
- List of clip-fed firearms
- List of semi-automatic rifles
