= Harris Gun Works M-96 =

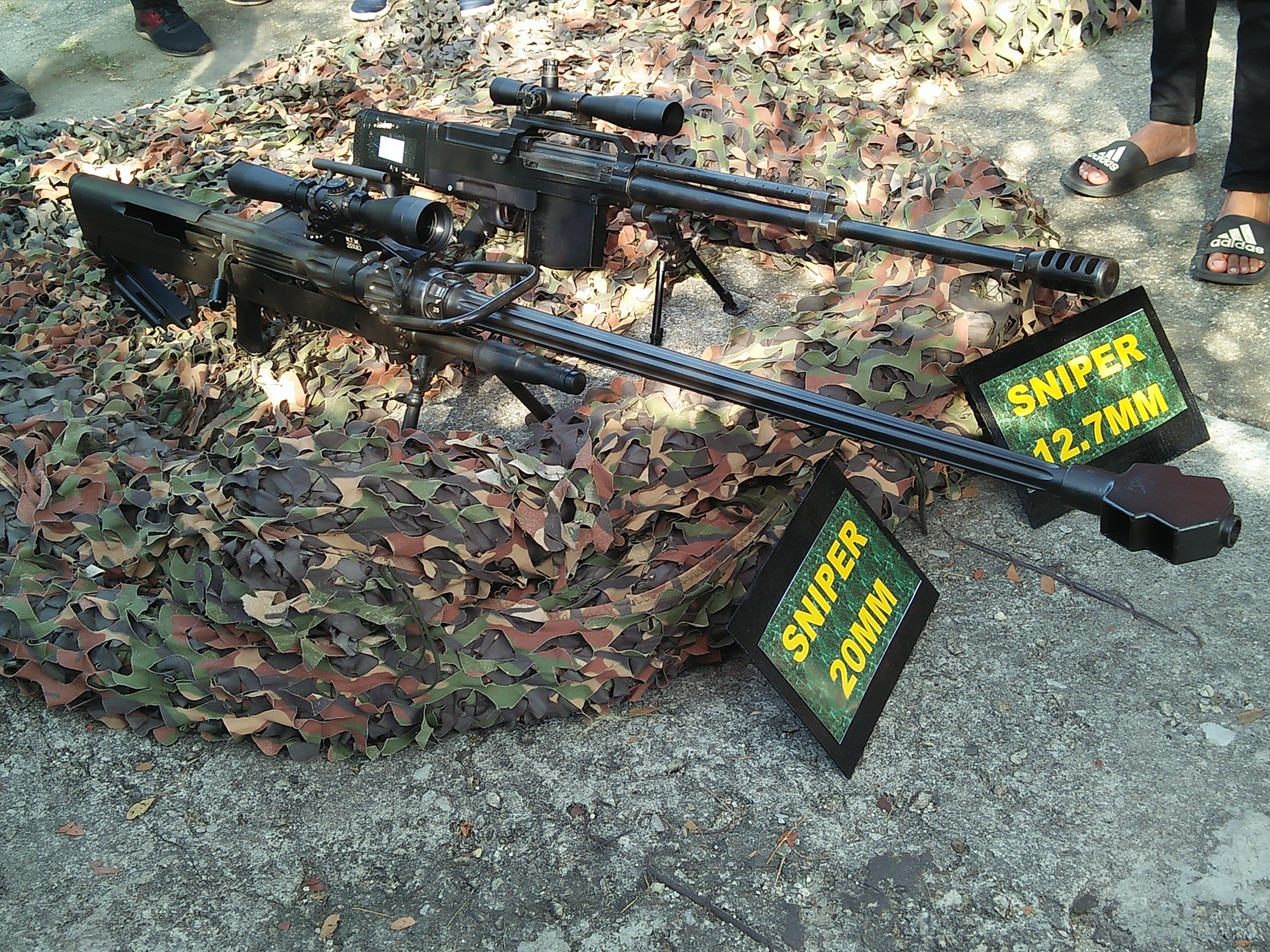
- Denel NTW-20 (20mm) and Harris Gun Works M-96 (12.7mm) of Malaysian Army in display during 2022 exhibition
- Type: Sniper rifle
- Place of origin: United States

Service history
- In service: 1996—present
- Used by: United States, Malaysia

Production history
- Manufacturer: Harris Gunworks
- Variants: M86, M92

Specifications
- Mass: 25 lbs (11.35 kg) unloaded, no scope.
- Length: 58 inches (145 cm).
- Barrel length: 29 inch (74 cm).
- Cartridge: 12.7x99mm NATO
- Caliber: .50 BMG
- Action: semi-automatic
- Rate of fire: Gas operated semi-automatic.
- Effective firing range: 5000 ft (1500 m).
- Feed system: 5-rounds detachable box magazine
- Sights: detachable aperture type iron sights day or night optics

The Harris Gunworks M-96 is a semi automatic sniper rifle. Manufactured by Harris Gunworks at Phoenix, Arizona, this is chambered for .50 BMG currently used heavily by the United States Armed Forces and Malaysian Armed Forces.
