= German Sport Guns GSG-5 =

GSG-5
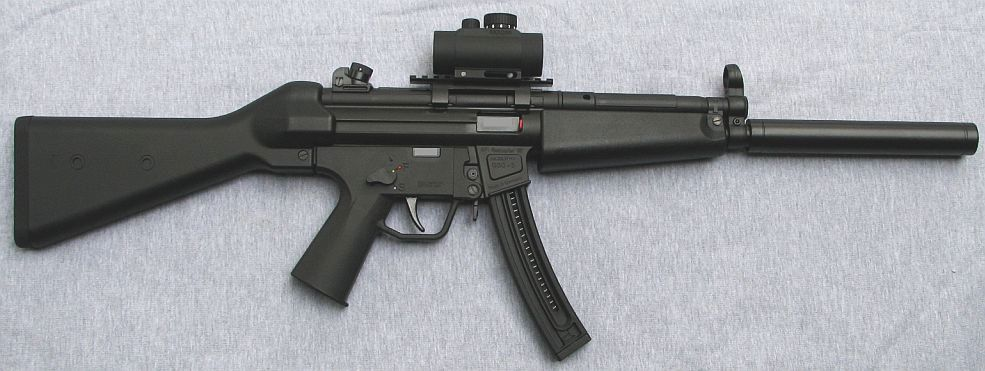
- GSG-5 L with red dot sight.
- Type: Rimfire semi-automatic rifle
- Place of origin: Germany

Production history
- Designer: Dietmar Emde
- Designed: 2007
- Manufacturer: German Sport Guns GmbH
- Unit cost: €549
- Produced: 2007–present
- Variants: GSG-5 A, GSG-5 L, GSG-5 P, GSG-5 PK

Specifications
- Mass: 2.9 kg (6.39 lb)
- Length: 714 mm (28.1 in)
- Barrel length: 230 mm (9.1 in)
- Cartridge: .22 Long Rifle
- Action: Blowback
- Muzzle velocity: 350 m/s (1,148 ft/s)
- Effective firing range: 150 m
- Feed system: 22, 15, 10 or 2-round detachable box magazine or 110-round drum magazine
- Sights: Rear: rotary drum with apertures; front: hooded post

The GSG-5 is a semi-automatic rimfire rifle chambered for the .22 Long Rifle cartridge. It is built by German Sport Guns GmbH, an airsoft wholesaler located in Ense-Höingen, Germany. It was unveiled at the IWA & Outdoor Classics trade show in March 2007 following the legalization of previously forbidden military-style weapons in Germany.

== Design ==
This rifle externally resembles the Heckler & Koch MP5 style submachine gun. German Sport Guns produces its own line of accessories, including retractable stocks and railed handguards. Many airsoft MP5 style accessories may also be used on the GSG-5. Magazines for the GSG-5 are available in 2-round, 10-round, 15-round, 22-round and 110-round drum configurations.

The GSG-5 utilizes the H&K style drum sight that is adjustable for windage. German Sport Guns provides a weaver rail attachment that slides onto the top of the frame, allowing other sighting systems to be added.

== Controversy ==
=== Lawsuit ===
In 2009, Heckler & Koch instituted a lawsuit against German Sport Guns and American Tactical Imports, Inc. over "trade dress infringements." The suit was settled on October 16, 2009, the outcome being that GSG will stop manufacturing the guns and ATI, Inc., will stop importing them. Support will continue for all previously sold rifles. (Heckler and Koch has instituted a spate of lawsuits lately against anyone copying any of the weapons they developed from the CETME, which is itself an outgrowth of the StG 45 assault rifle developed by the Wehrmacht in World War II.)

=== Fake Suppressor Reclassified ===
In January 2010, in the United States; the Bureau of Alcohol, Tobacco, Firearms and Explosives ruled that the previously approved barrel shroud included with the GSG 5 SD to give the cosmetic appearance of a real suppressor (or "silencer") is a true suppressor, despite it being incapable of functioning as a suppressor, and therefore is regulated under the National Firearms Act. ATI, Inc. instituted a recall of the item.

Owners can check to see if their firearm is affected by the recall via this web site

== Variants ==
The GSG-5 is produced in several different versions:

- GSG-5 A: With a 230 mm (9.1 in) barrel.
- GSG-5 L: Equipped with a 414 mm (16.3 in) barrel, designed to meet the legal requirements for minimum barrel length and overall length in several countries (including the United States & United Kingdom). The longer barrel is covered with a barrel shroud (mock suppressor) for aesthetic purposes.
- GSG-5 SD:Similar to GSG-5 L but with both a larger fore grip and mock suppressor, similar in look to a MP5-SD. the GSG-5 SD is the subject of the above-mentioned ATF ruling, and owners can check to see if their GSG-5 is affected via this web site.
- GSG-5 P: Pistol variant with an endcap instead of a buttstock. Barrel length is identical to the "A" version.
- GSG-5 PK: Similar to the GSG-5 P, but with a 119 mm (4.7 in) barrel and shorter handguard.

== Users ==
- Luhansk People's Republic: Used by bodyguards of Pro-Russian collaborator Oleg Tsaryov.
