= Maximum brake torque =

Tuning setting at which an engine achieves maximum torque

Maximum brake torque (MBT) is the use of optimal ignition timing to take advantage of an internal combustion engine's maximum power and efficiency.

There is always an optimal spark timing for all operating conditions of an engine. MBT is ideal at wide-open throttle (WOT), but not desirable when the engine is at idle. Although MBT is desired at WOT, it is wise to retard timing slightly to prevent knocking that may occur and to create a small safety margin. It is possible to calculate the MBT of an engine by taking into account all of the operating conditions of an engine through its sensors. Operating conditions are defined by these engine parameters: lambda (air/fuel ratio), engine load, internal exhaust gas recirculation, engine speed, and spark advance.
