= MCEM 3 submachine gun =

MCEM 3
- Type: Submachine gun
- Place of origin: United Kingdom

Production history
- Designer: Royal Small Arms Factory
- Designed: 1947

Specifications
- Cartridge: 9×19mm Parabellum
- Action: Blowback
- Sights: Fixed

The MCEM 3 was a proposed collapsible 9mm submachine gun designed by the British in 1947. It had a detachable stock alongside the magazine and a Lee–Enfield type bayonet. However the MCEM 3 was not accepted and found no customers.
