= Manufacturing Business Technology =

- Website type: website
- Available in: English
- Founded: 1984
- Headquarters: Madison, Wisconsin, US
- Owner: Industrial Media
- Editors: Jeff Reinke (Editorial Director), Nolan Beilstein (Associate Editor), Anna K. Wells (Executive Editor), David Mantey (Editorial Director of Digital Media)
- Website: Manufacturing Business Technology
- ISSN: 1554-3404

Manufacturing Business Technology (ISSN 1554-3404) is a website currently owned by Industrial Media. The site serves the information needs of information technology professionals involved in production, supply chain management, and operations within a manufacturing enterprise. MBT's mission is to inform its readers about the critical issues related to IT professionals and the manufacturing industry, specifically automation, artificial intelligence, cybersecurity, the Industrial Internet of Things and software.

The website's editorial staff as of April 2026 includes Jeff Reinke, Editorial Director, Nolan Beilstein, Associate Editor, Anna K. Wells, Executive Editor and David Mantey, Editorial Director of Digital Media. MBT's editorial offices are located in Madison, Wisconsin.

Established in 1984, Manufacturing Business Technology publishes daily breaking news about the manufacturing and IT industries. MBT also produces the Security Breach podcast, which has published more than 150 episodes as of April 2026. Hosted by MBT's Editorial Director Jeff Reinke, the Security Breach podcast publishes episodes twice a month and features one-on-one interviews with manufacturing executives, cybersecurity professionals and industry influencers. For example, the podcast has featured Jack Rhysider, the host and founder of the Darknet Diaries podcast, and Frank Riccardi, the author of Mobilizing the C-Suite – Waging War Against Cyberattacks.

Common topics of news and editorial pieces include automation integration, cybersecurity, network security, software implementation and use, supply chain awareness, product lifecycle management, software and system vendor selection, systems integration, validating return on investment, identifying and eliminating inefficiencies in terms of workflow and software performance, and training to understand a platform's full potential.

The Manufacturing Business Technology site was re-launched by Industrial Media in October, 2019. MBT was formerly owned by Advantage Business Marketing (formerly Advantage Business Media). Industrial Media acquired MBT after Advantage Business Marketing shuttered in June 2019.
