= Type Kō Rifle =

Type Kō Prototype Automatic Rifle
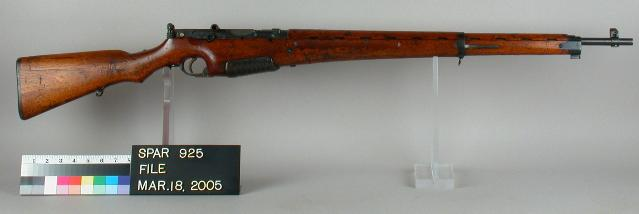
- A Type Kō on display at the Springfield Armory
- Type: Experimental semi-automatic rifle
- Place of origin: Empire of Japan

Production history
- Designer: Hayahiko Mihara
- Designed: 1933
- Manufacturer: Kokura Arsenal
- Produced: 1933–1935
- No. built: c.24

Specifications
- Mass: 4.25 kilograms (9.4 lb) (longer barrel)
- Length: 116 centimeters (46 in) (longer barrel) 106 centimeters (42 in) (shorter barrel)
- Barrel length: 672 millimeters (26.5 in) (full-length) 573 millimeters (22.6 in) (carbine)
- Cartridge: 6.5x50mm Arisaka
- Caliber: 6.5mm
- Action: Toggle-locked, Blowback
- Rate of fire: 30 rounds/min
- Effective firing range: 3,500 meters (11,500 ft)
- Feed system: 10-round rotary magazine
- Sights: Adjustable aperture sight

The Type Kō prototype automatic rifle (Japanese: 試製自動小銃甲号 Shisei Jidō Shōjū Kō Gō) was a semi-automatic rifle developed by the Empire of Japan during the 1930s. Its design is heavily based on the Pedersen rifle. It used a unusual 10-round rotary magazine in the form of non-removable internal box magazine.

== See also ==
- List of clip-fed firearms
- Type Otsu Rifle
- Type Hei Rifle
- Type 4 Rifle
