= German Sport Guns GmbH =

German manufacturer of firearms

- Industry: Arms industry
- Founded: 2002
- Founder: Dietmar Emde, Manfred Nienhaus, and Michael Swoboda
- Headquarters: Ense-Höingen, Germany
- Key people: Dietmar Emde, Manfred Nienhaus, and Michael Swoboda (founders and CEOs)
- Products: Firearms
- Revenue: €22.7 million (2023)
- Website: germansportguns.de

German Sport Guns GmbH is a German firearm manufacturer. Their company focus is on .22 LR firearms, intended for sport shooting and plinking.

Its products are copies or replicas of famous military firearms, but are often subject to much less legal scrutiny because of the cartridge they use.

A significant aspect of German Sport Guns' business model is its collaboration with other firearm manufacturers and distributors.

This collaboration extends to various countries.

The company also produces airsoft replicas.

== Products ==
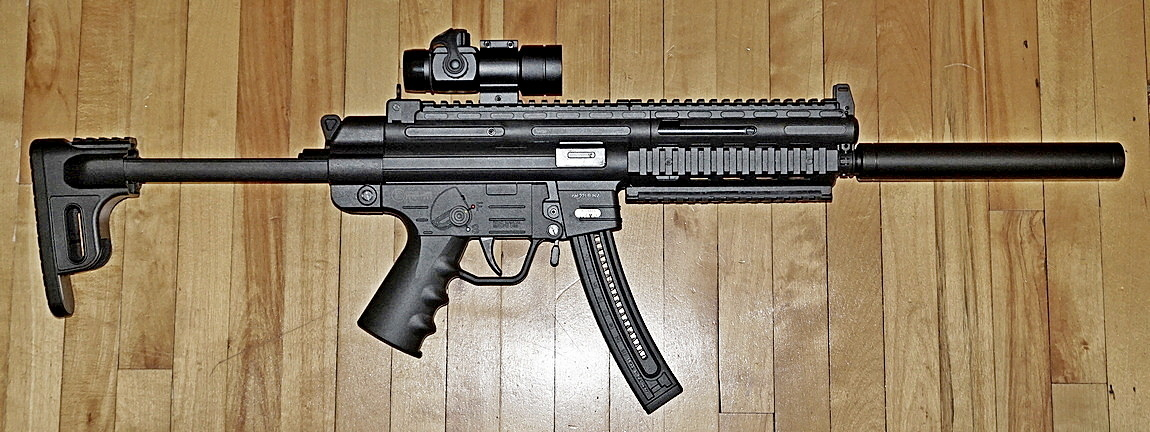
GSG-16 .22lr with red dot sight

- GSG-5, GSG-522, GSG-16, a .22 lookalike of the Heckler & Koch MP5
- GSG G14, a different version of a G36C
- GSG AK-47, a .22 lookalike of the Kalashnikov AK-47 and its derivatives. As of 2020, GSG offers seven variants of this series, including the “Rebel,” which is meant to replicate the appearance of an AK-style firearm in guerrilla warfare
- GSG-1911, a .22 copy of the Browning M1911 pistol
- GSG-StG 44, a .22 copy of the StG 44
- GSG-MP40P, a 9mm, semi-automatic pistol lookalike of the MP 40 submachine gun
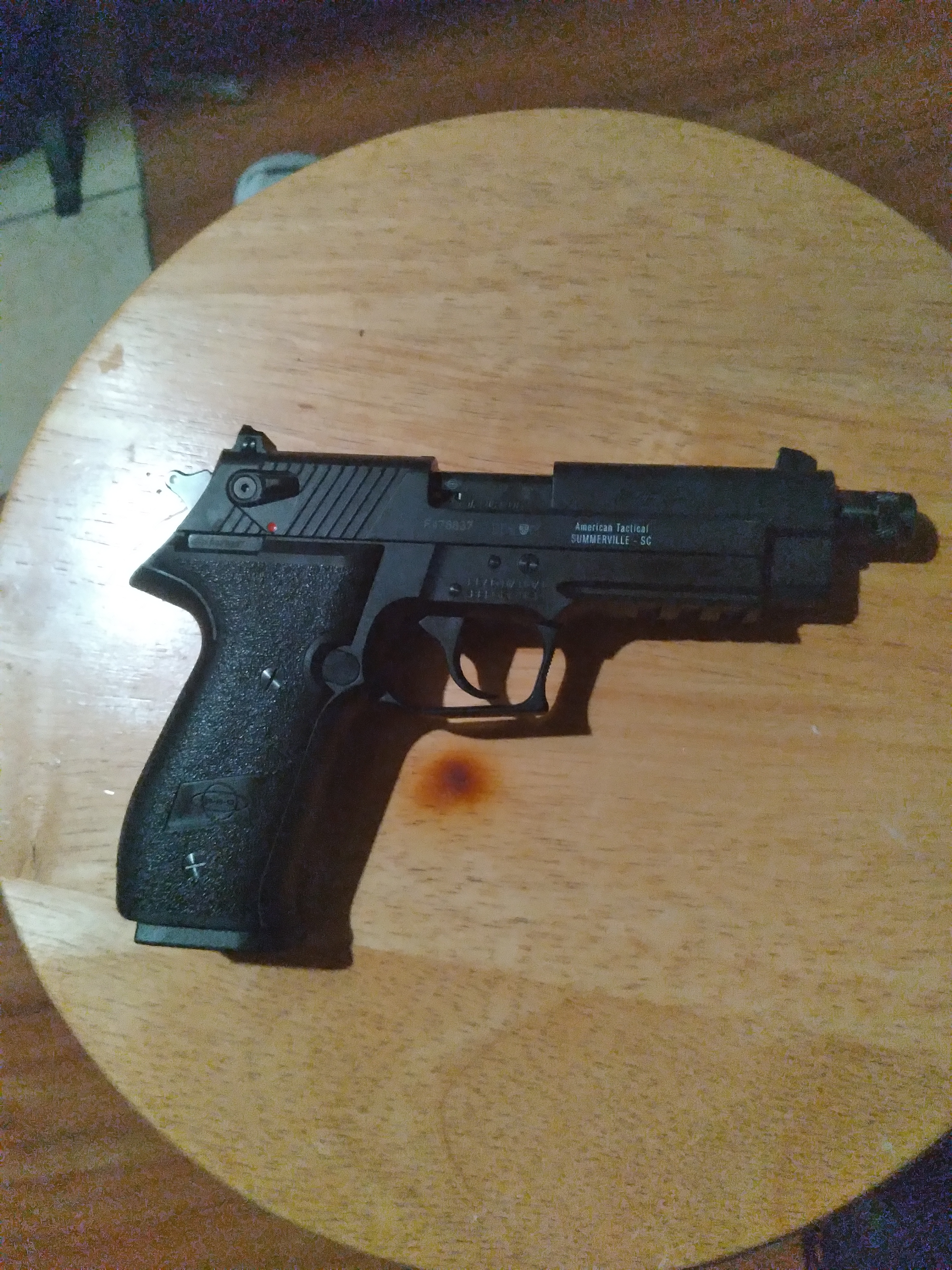
- GSG Firefly in 22 LR.
  GSG FireFly, license produced SIG Sauer Mosquito, a downsized copy of the SIG Sauer P226 chambered in .22 lr.
- GSG-themed clothing
