= Remington Model 24 =

Small-bore semi-automatic rifle designed by John Browning

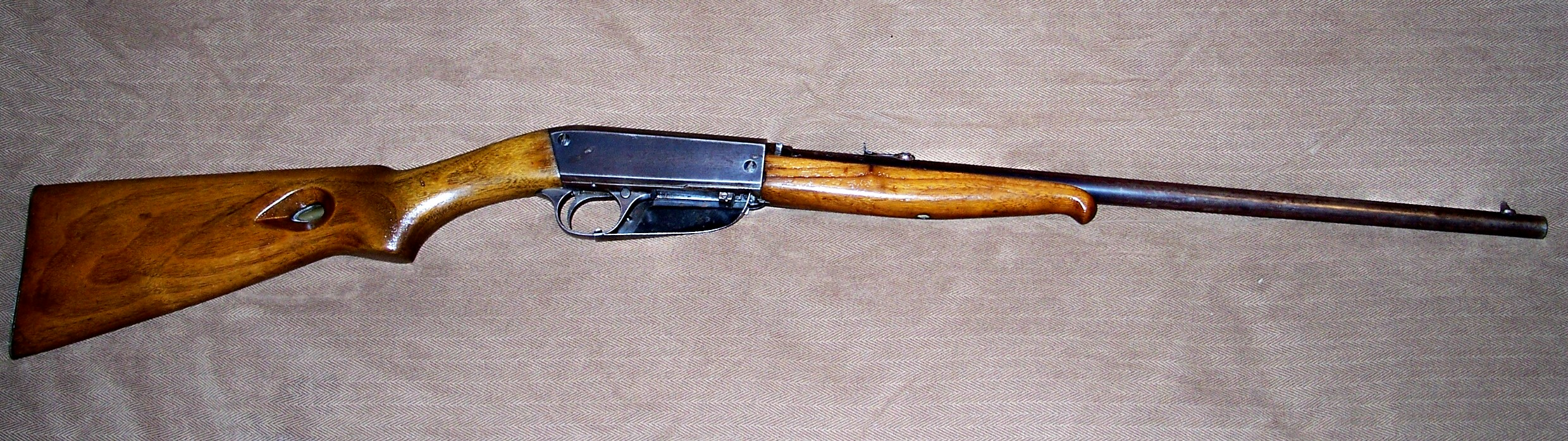

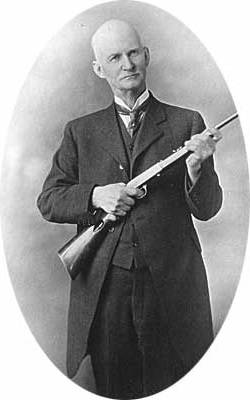
John Browning holding what appears to be a Remington Model 24 semi-automatic .22 rifle.

Based on a John Browning design and manufactured from 1922 to 1935, the Remington model 24 is a semi-automatic rifle chambered in either .22 Short or .22 long rifle. It is very closely related to the Browning 22 Semi-Auto rifle (the Browning SA-22), which is still in production. It is a takedown gun, meaning that the barrel and receiver are easily separated without tools, allowing for a smaller package for transport. A case deflector (seen in the image here) that hooked into the receiver and clipped onto the trigger guard was available.

When comparing the Model 24 to the Browning SA-22, it will be seen that the Model 24 is of a more delicate (lighter build) design. When Remington ceased production of the Model 24 in 1935, it was replaced by the Remington 241. The Model 241 is closer to the Browning SA-22 in terms of size and overall appearance than the earlier Model 24.

The Model 24 uses a barrel tightening method (which was needed due to the takedown nature of the design in which the barrel can be separated from the receiver) that is very close to that of the Browning SA-22. That tightening method uses an adjusting ring on the lower end of the barrel where it presses up against the receiver. The Model 241 uses a different method of tightening the barrel to the receiver (a dual-sided nut with an interrupted-screw threading rides inside the opening in the front of the receiver and, by selecting how deeply the nut sits in the receiver, it controls how tightly the barrel fits against the receiver when the barrel is fitted to the receiver. This mechanism of the Model 241 is not visible unless the barrel is separated from the receiver so that the opening in the front of the receiver can be viewed).
