= FEG Model 58 =

SA-85 rifle
- Type: Semi-automatic Rifle
- Place of origin: Hungary

Production history
- Manufacturer: Fegyver És Gépgyár (F.E.G.)
- Variants: Solid stock; Fold-under stock

Specifications
- Cartridge: 7.62×39mm
- Action: Semi-automatic, gas-operated, rotating-bolt
- Sights: Adjustable rear leaf sight, front post

The SA-85 is an AK-pattern rifle made by Fegyver És Gépgyár (F.E.G.) of Hungary. It was sold in a "sporting" configuration to get around U.S. gun laws at the time. It was also imported into the United States pre-banin two variants, a solid thumbhole style stock and a underfolder stock that folded under the rifle. This rifle is a semi-automatic version of the Russian AK-47, with a strange thumb-hole butt-stock, helping to make it a legal hunting rifle in the United States. It was a preferred choice of Kalashnikov style rifles over the cheaper but inferior, Chinese models.

The SA-58 is a semi-automatic version of the Russian AK-47, with a thumbhole buttstock, helping to make it a legal hunting rifle in the United States.
