= Savage Model 64 =

Model 64 series
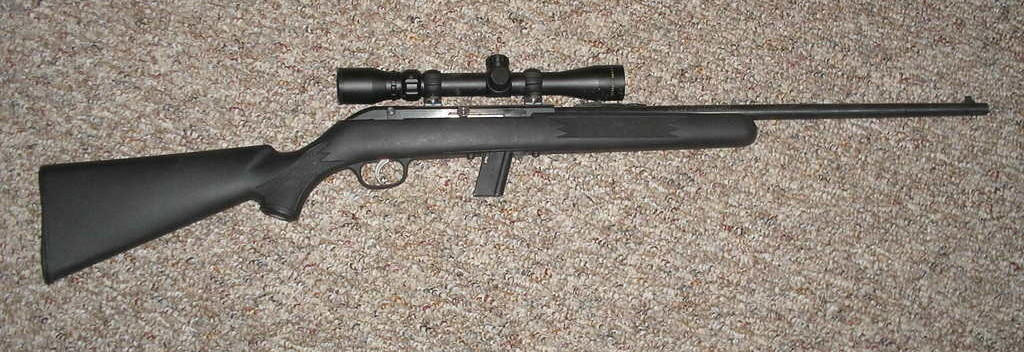
- Savage Model 64F with an optional scope attached
- Type: Semi-automatic rifle
- Place of origin: Canada

Production history
- Designer: Hubert Cooey

Specifications
- Cartridge: .22 long rifle
- Action: blowback, self-loading
- Rate of fire: Semi-automatic
- Muzzle velocity: 380 m/s (1,260ft/s)
- Effective firing range: (150 m) (163 yd)
- Feed system: 10-round, 20-round detachable box magazines

Savage Model 64 series is a semi-automatic .22 LR rifle made by Savage Arms in Canada. It operates on a simple blowback action. It is marketed to beginning shooters, small-game hunters, and budget-minded target shooters. It is one of the more popular hunting and target-shooting rifles in the United States due to its accuracy, use of the popular and inexpensive .22 long rifle ammunition, and its low price.

Originally introduced as the Cooey Model 64, it came on the market in 1964. The firearm was designed by Hubert Cooey, and was based on the design of the Model 39.

The Cooey plant closed in 1979, with many employees and machines moving to Lakefield Arms Company. Savage Arms purchased Lakefield Arms in 1995 and continued production under the Savage and Stevens labels.

It is unusual among semiautomatic 22s, and traditional semi-automatic rifles in general, in that it is available in a true left-handed version featuring a left-handed safety, charging handle and ejection port.

The "64 series" has also sold as "62", "954" with one or more letters and as Sears Roebuck & Co. Model 6C. Although often unexpressed in speech, the Model 64 is almost always followed by a single series letter."64" without a letter indicates the first year of manufacture only. The first version had a plastic magazine. It was followed by the 64B.

The Model 64 Savage has a free floating barrel, standard.

In 2019, Savage designed a variant of the Model 64 designed for easy disassembly and reassembly. This variant is called the Model 64 Takedown. The Model 64 Takedown is only available in matte-black with synthetic stock. It comes out of the box drilled and tapped for scope mounts. The Model 64 Takedown is manufactured at Savage's facility in Canada.
