= Browning 22 Semi-Auto rifle =

Browning 22 Semi-Auto
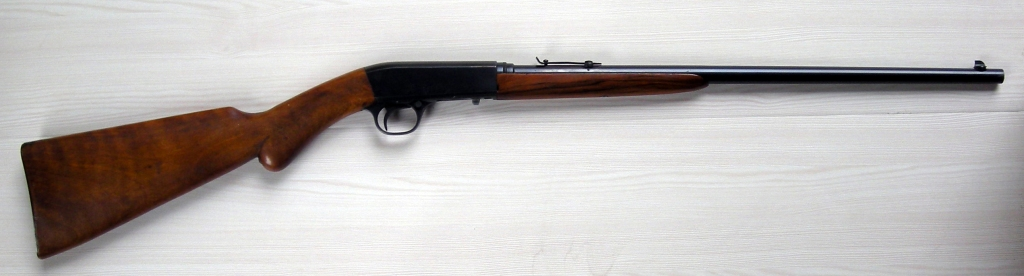
- Type: Sporting rifle
- Place of origin: Belgium

Production history
- Designer: John Browning
- Manufacturer: FN Herstal
- Produced: 1914-present

Specifications
- Mass: 5.2 pounds (2.4 kg)
- Length: 37 inches (94 cm)
- Barrel length: 19.25 inches (489 mm)
- Cartridge: .22 Long Rifle, .22 Short
- Caliber: .22
- Action: Semi-automatic
- Feed system: Integral tube magazine (10x.22 LR; 15x.22 Short)
- Sights: iron

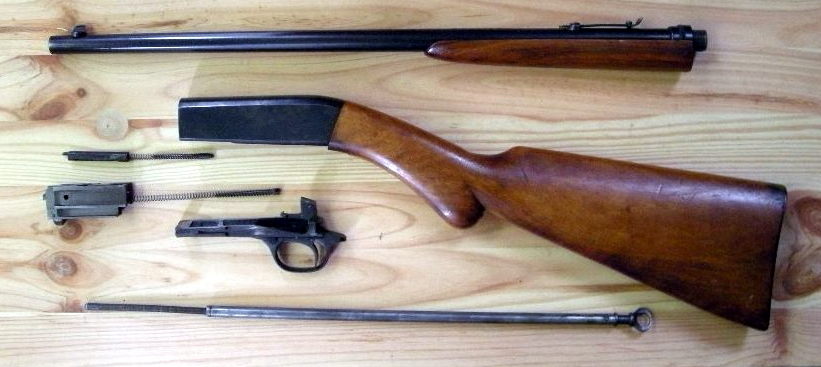
FN Browning .22 disassembled

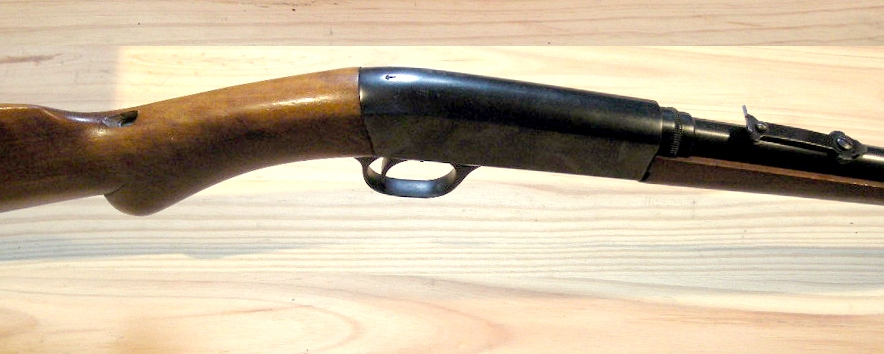
FN Browning .22 receiver

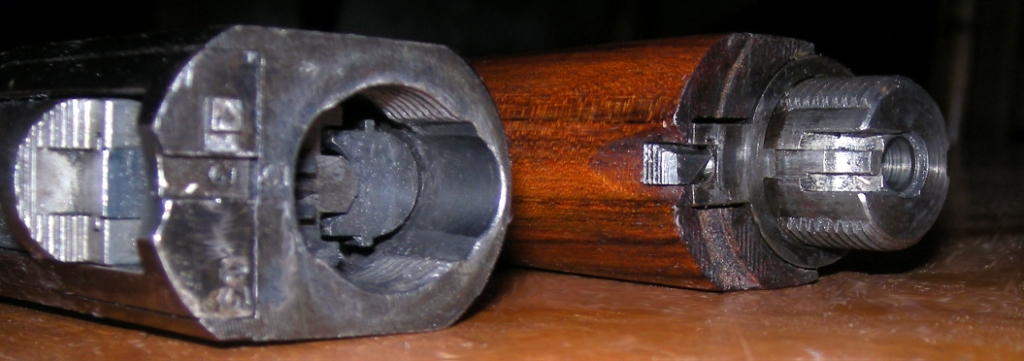
FN Browning .22, barrel dismounted

The Browning 22 Semi-Auto rifle, also known as the semi automatic 22 or SA-22, is a takedown rifle produced by FN Herstal based on a John Browning patent. The rifle is currently produced by Browning as the Semi-Auto 22. Production began in 1914 and continued through 1973 in Belgium and production continued in 1974 in Japan by Miroku. It was first exported by FN for the American market in 1956. Remington manufactured a lighter weight version under license from 1919 to 1935 as the Remington Model 24 and then replaced it with the Remington Model 241 in 1935. Except for the barrel locking mechanism the Remington Model 241 is very similar to the Browning SA-22. A close copy of the SA-22 was made by the Chinese company Norinco and imported into the US by Interarms as the Model ATD.

The SA-22 was the first production semi-automatic rifle chambered in .22 LR caliber, and is regarded as a classic firearm. It has been offered in several "grades" of engraving and gold inlay, and is a widely collected gun, especially those manufactured in Belgium.

The Semi-auto .22 is a made from blued steel and walnut, and ejects spent cases downward. This feature was intended by the designer to keep the user's face "protected from gasses and flying particles while firing", at which it succeeds especially for smaller people. Downward-ejected hot spent cases can become trapped in a shirt sleeve, so care should be taken to avoid this with proper hand placement on the forend. The rifle was intended for a wide age range, and period advertisements recommend the rifle both for adult usage as well as appropriate for youth shooters. The lack of a side-mounted ejection port also leaves a large "canvas" for engraving. Factory engraving was done by hand at FN Herstal, and is done by laser engraving with hand finishing at Miroku. It has occasionally been sold with a factory fitted hard case, or with scope mounting grooves on the receiver.

Initial production models had a small loading port located on the top of the stock in contrast to later models which had the loading port located on the right side of the buttstock.

Over half a million SA-22 rifles have been sold since 1914.
