= Harris Gunworks =

U.S. firearms manufacturer

- Industry: Firearms
- Predecessor: G. McMillan & Co.
- Founder: Wes Harris
- Headquarters: Phoenix, Arizona, United States
- Website: www.harrisbarrelworks.com

Harris Gunworks, a Phoenix, Arizona based U.S. firearms manufacturer, began operations as G. McMillan & Co. after Gale McMillan spun off the rifle building portion of his McMillan Rifle Stock business. McMillan sold this to a group of investors headed by Wes Harris. With Harris as President, the company received its first of many military contract awards. Harris parlayed McMillan's reputation for high quality, high accuracy benchrest competition rifles (previously built primarily from the rifle actions of other manufacturers), to create markets for military sniper rifles and custom hunting rifles.

== Products ==
Harris Gunworks offers in-house manufactured actions, barrels, and stocks; which are all key to Harris’ ability to produce rifles with guaranteed accuracy.

The following are firearms offered by Harris Gunworks:

=== Benchrest Competitor ===
.222 Rem., .243 Win., 6mm Rem., 6mm PPC, 6mm BR, or .308 Win. cal., benchrest configuration.

=== Long Range Target ===
.300 Win. Mag., .300 Phoenix, .30-378 Wby. Mag., .30-416 Rigby, .338 Lapua, or 7mm Rem. Mag. cal., black synthetic fully adj. stock, w/o sights, matt finished stainless steel barrel.

=== M-40 Sniper Rifle ===
.308 Win. cal., Remington action with McMillan match grade heavy contour barrel, fiberglass stock with recoil pad, 4 shot mag., 9 lbs.

=== M-86 Sniper Rifle ===
.300 Win. Mag., or .308 Win. cal., fiberglass stock, variety of optical sights.

=== M-87 Long Range Sniper Rifle ===
.50 BMG cal., stainless steel bolt action, 29 in. barrel with muzzle brake, single shot, synthetic stock, accurate to 2,000 meters, 26 lbs.

=== M-87R Long Range Sniper Rifle ===
Similar specs. as Model 87, except has 5 shot fixed box mag.

=== M-88 U.S. NAVY Long Range Sniper Rifle ===
.50 BMG cal., reintroduced U.S. Navy Seal Team shell holder single shot action with thumbhole stock (one-piece or breakdown two-piece), 24 lbs.

=== M-89 Sniper Rifle ===
.308 Win. caliber, 24 in. heavy contoured match grade barrel, fiberglass stock adjustable for length, detachable box magazine and recoil pad, 15 1/4 lbs.

=== M-92 Bull Pup Long Range Sniper Rifle ===
.50 BMG cal., bullpup single shot, mid-grip configuration.

=== M-93 Long Range Sniper Rifle ===
.50 BMG cal., similar to M-87, except has folding stock and detachable 5 or 10 shot box mag.

=== M-95 Titanium/Graphite Long Range Sniper Rifle ===
.50 BMG cal., features titanium alloy M-87 receiver with graphite barrel and steel liner, single shot or repeater, approx. 18 lbs.

=== M-96 Semi-Automatic Long Range Sniper Rifle ===
The Harris Gun Works M-96 is .50 BMG cal., gas-operated with 5 shot detachable mag., carry handle scope mount, steel receiver, 30 lbs.

=== National Match Competitor ===
.308 Win., or 7mm-08 Rem. cal.

=== Signature Alaskan ===
Available in many calibers between .270 Win. and .458 Win. Mag.

=== Signature Classic Sporter ===
Various calibers. available between .22-250 Rem. and .416 Rem., premium wood stock, matte metal finish, buttoning used on rifling for 22 or 24 in. stainless steel barrel, action made from 416 stainless or 4340 chrome moly steel (either left- or right-handed), 3 or 4 shot mag. supplied with 5 shot test target.

=== Signature Titanium Mountain Rifle ===
.270 Win., .280 Rem., .30-06, .300 Win. Mag., .338 Win. Mag., or 7mm Rem. Mag. cal., lighter weight variation with shorter stainless steel or graphite/steel composite barrel, 5 3/4 (with graphite/steel composite barrel), or 6 1/2 lbs.

=== Signature Varminter ===
Similar to Signature Model, except is available in 12 cals. between .22-250 Rem. and .350 Rem. Mag., hand bedded fiberglass stock, adj. trigger, 26 in. heavily contoured barrel.

=== Talon Safari ===
Available in many calibres between .300 Win. Mag. and .460 Wby. Mag., hand bedded fiberglass stock, 4 shot mag., 24 in. stainless steel barrel, matte black finish, 9 1/2 lbs.

=== Talon Sporter ===
Available in various calibres between .22-250 Rem. and .416 Rem., receiver available in either 4340 chrome molybdenum or 416 stainless steel, match grade barrel.

=== .300 Phoenix ===
Available in the proprietary 300 Phoenix cartridge and in most popular .30 calibers, fiberglass stock with adj. cheekpiece and buttplate, right or left hand action, 12 1/2 lbs. (note: this item never entered the production phase due to problems obtaining projected velocities)

== U.S. & International Military Users: M87, M87R, M93 and M96 - .50 BMG Long Range Sniper Rifles ==
- Germany: M87R Sniper Rifle 1997
- France: French Foreign Legion M88 Sniper Rifle 1990.
  - French Marine: M87R Sniper Rifle 50 units 1994.
- Norway: Norwegian Army: M96 Sniper Rifle 1996
- Malaysia: Malaysian Army: M96 Sniper Rifle 1996/97
- Pakistan: Pakistani Army M93 Sniper Rifle 1995
- Saudi Arabia: Saudi Ministry of Defense & Aviation / Saudi Army M93 1994
- Sweden: Swedish Army: M96 Sniper Rifle 1996
- Turkey: Turkish Gendarmerie M87R Sniper Rifle 1995
- United Kingdom: SAS United Kingdom 1990/92 M87 and M88 Sniper rifles
- United States: U.S. Atomic Energy Commission: M87R Rifle
  - U.S. Navy Seals|United States Naval Special Warfare Development Group| 1988/89 M-88 Sniper Rifle

== U.S. & International Military Users: M40, M40-A2, M24, M86 and M89 - 7.62 NATO, .300 Win, .338 Lapua Caliber Sniper Rifles ==
- Germany: M89 in 1996.
- Israel: M89 Rifle deployed in 1992.
- Malaysia Federal Police of Malaysia - M89 deployed in 1996.
- Philippines Philippines Army - M89 Rifle deployed in 1990.
- United States U.S. Navy Seals 1986, 1989.
  - U.S. Department of Corrections - all Federal Prisons in the U.S. deploy the M86 Rifle
  - U.S. Army Special Forces - M89 deployed in 1989.
  - Many Local, County and State Police agencies throughout the U.S. deploy the M40, M40-A2, M24, M86 and M89 rifles
