= MBT 1925 =

- Type: Prototype straight-pull bolt-action rifle
- Place of origin: Kingdom of Italy

Service history
- Wars: World War II

Production history
- Produced: 1925
- No. built: 3

Specifications
- Cartridge: 6.5x52mm Carcano
- Action: Straight-pull bolt action
- Feed system: 6-round en bloc clip, internal box magazine
- Sights: V-notch

The MBT 1925 was a prototype straight-pull bolt-action rifle of Italian origin. The rifle is fed by en-bloc clips and chambered for the 6.5x52mm Carcano cartridge.

== Overview ==
The MBT 1925 is fed from Carcano M91 clips that fall out of the bottom when the magazine is empty. The magazine follower closely resembles that of the M91. Despite appearing to be semiautomatic, it actually functions as a straight-pull manually operated bolt action. The massive cylindrical bolt is in two sections of roughly equal size, front and rear. The rear section rotates when the bolt is opened via a spiral cam slot cut into it on the right side (possibly on the left as well, covered by the receiver). The front bolt segment does not turn.

The bolt handle on the right side is engaged only when the large, round knob is pushed in, and functions only to retract the bolt. The forward movement of the bolt comes from a mainspring behind the bolt. There is a long, narrow flat plate on the top of the receiver, which has slight fore-and-aft movement.
