= Vulcan V18 =

- Type: Semi-automatic Rifle
- Place of origin: United States

Production history
- Manufacturer: Vulcan Group Inc.
- Unit cost: $889
- Produced: 1991-Present

Specifications
- Mass: 6.8 lb (3,100 g) empty, w/ magazine
- Length: 39 in (99 cm)
- Barrel length: 20 in (51 cm)
- Cartridge: 5.56×45mm NATO
- Action: Short-stroke piston, rotating bolt
- Feed system: all NATO STANAG 4179-compliant magazines

The Vulcan V18 is a semi-automatic rifle based on the ArmaLite AR-180, chambered in 5.56×45mm NATO. It was built using a modified carbon fibre AR-15 lower receiver coupled with a modified AR-180 upper receiver formed from heat treated SAE 4130 steel. Standard features of the rifle include an A2-style flash hider, 20” chrome lined barrel with a 1-7” twist, FAL-style hand guard, and polymer side-folding stock. Additionally, it utilizes STANAG magazines.
