= Royal Small Arms Factory =

Rifle factory in Enfield, London, 1816–1988

Coordinates: 51.668738°N 0.016048°W

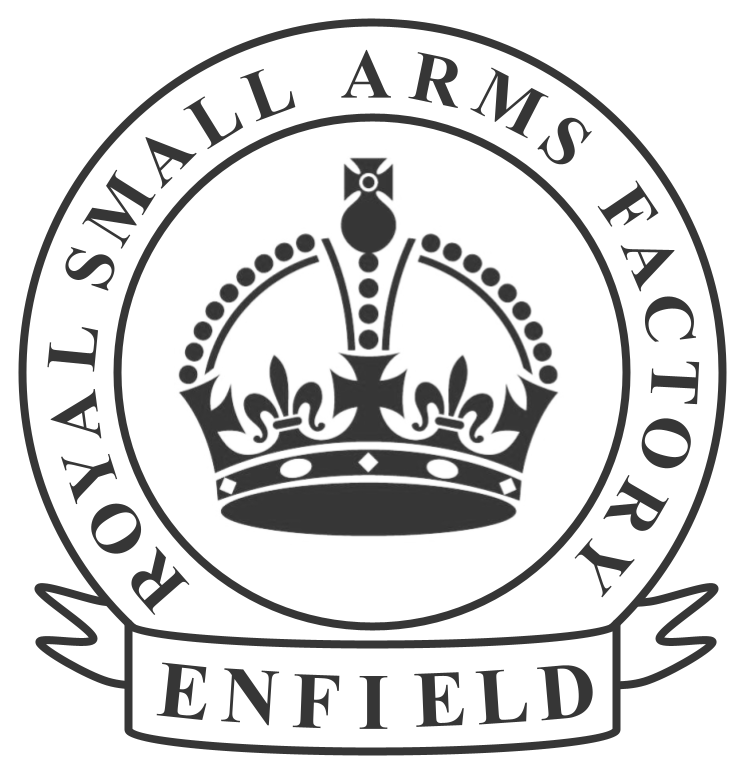
- Company type: State-owned
- Industry: Firearms
- Founded: 1816; 210 years ago
- Defunct: 1988; 38 years ago
- Fate: Dissolved
- Successor: Royal Ordnance
- Headquarters: Enfield Lock, London, England

The Royal Small Arms Factory (RSAF), also known by the metonym Enfield, was a UK government-owned rifle factory in Enfield, adjoining the Lee Navigation in the Lea Valley. Some parts were in Waltham Abbey. The factory produced British military rifles, muskets and swords from 1816. It closed in 1988, but some of its work was transferred to other sites.

The factory designed and manufactured many famous British Army weapons including the Lee–Enfield rifles which were standard equipment during both World Wars.

== History ==
The RSAF had its origins in a short-lived Royal Manufactory of Small Arms established in Lewisham in 1807. The site in Lewisham was a mill where armour had been made since the fourteenth century. Following its purchase by Henry VIII in 1530, it became known as the Royal Armoury Mills and served his armoury in Greenwich. During the Napoleonic War, the increasing demand for large quantities of reliable weapons prompted the Board of Ordnance to look into building a new factory on a larger site.

=== Foundation ===
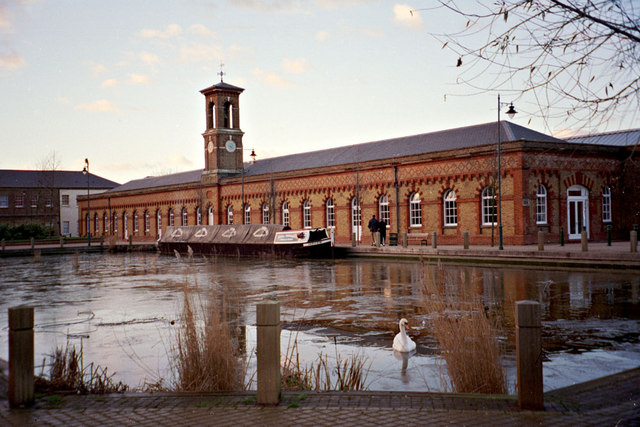
The RSAF machine shop overlooking basin, November 2007

The factory was to be located at Enfield Lock on a marshy island bordered by the River Lea and the Lee Navigation. The land was acquired in 1812 and the factory completed by 1816. The site had the advantages of water-power to drive the machinery and the River Lea Navigation for the transportation by barge of raw materials and finished weapons to the River Thames, 15 miles away, to be loaded onto sailing ships. Neighbouring farmland was acquired to become a restricted area to test ordnance from the Royal Gunpowder Mill.

The RSAF was originally all situated on the east side of the Lea, in the Sewardstone hamlet of Waltham Holy Cross parish, in Essex. The course of the river was diverted during the life of the factory, and part of the site then fell in Enfield parish. Local boundary changes initiated by SI 1993/1141 after it closed transferred the site entirely from Epping Forest District to the London Borough of Enfield.

The original ambitious plans by Captain John By included three mills. Later, the engineer John Rennie recommended the construction of a navigable leat. The leat was made, although only one mill with two waterwheels was completed.

In 1816 the barrel branch was transferred from Lewisham. By 1818 the lock and finishing branches had been moved to the site, enabling the closure of the Lewisham factory. A sword-making department was set up in 1823.

=== The Crimean War ===
The factory fought off the threat of closure in 1831. It remained quite modest in size until the Crimean War of 1853/1856, which resulted in vastly increased production.

In 1856 a machine shop was built on American mass-production lines, using American machinery powered by steam engines. The shop was based on a design by Sir John Anderson and built by the Royal Engineers. The workforce increased to 1,000. By 1860 an average of 1,744 rifles were produced per week.

In 1866 another major expansion took place, when the watermill gave way to steampower. The total number of steam engines grew to sixteen. By 1887 there were 2,400 employees.

==== Sparkbrook ====
After the liquidation of the National Arms and Ammunition Company in 1887, a number of workshops at Sparkbrook were purchased and named Royal Small Arms Factory, Sparkbrook. There were also repair operations in Birmingham. In March 1893 there were 2,025 employees at Enfield and 664 at Sparkbrook, the Sparkbrook number having been reduced by ten per cent in the previous six months. In 1894, repair work was moved from Bagot Street to Sparkbrook. In 1905 manufacture at Sparkbrook was ended and the factory acquired by BSA in early 1906.

Production of the new model rifle designed by James Paris Lee began in 1889. The famous Lee–Enfield rifle was designed in 1895.

=== 20th century ===
The factory expanded during World War I and World War II. Two other Royal Ordnance Factories were set up in World War II to manufacture rifles designed at RSAF Enfield, to increase arms output in areas less vulnerable to bombing: ROF Fazakerley and ROF Maltby. Both of these have long been closed.

Decline set in after World War II. In 1963 half the site was closed.

The Royal Small Arms Factory was privatised in 1984 along with a number of Royal Ordnance Factories to become part of Royal Ordnance Plc. It was later bought by British Aerospace (BAe). They closed the site in 1988.

== The significance of RSAF Enfield ==
The factory was set up because of disappointment with the poor quality and high cost of the existing British weapons used in the Napoleonic Wars. At this time in Britain, individual components were made mainly in the Gun Quarter, Birmingham by a number of independent manufacturers and then hand-assembled to produce muskets. These component makers eventually combined to become the Birmingham Small Arms Company. The Enfield factory was intended to improve the quality and to drive down costs.

== Weapons designed / built at RSAF Enfield ==
Almost all the weapons in which the Royal Small Arms Factory had a hand in design or production carry either the word Enfield or the letters EN in their name;

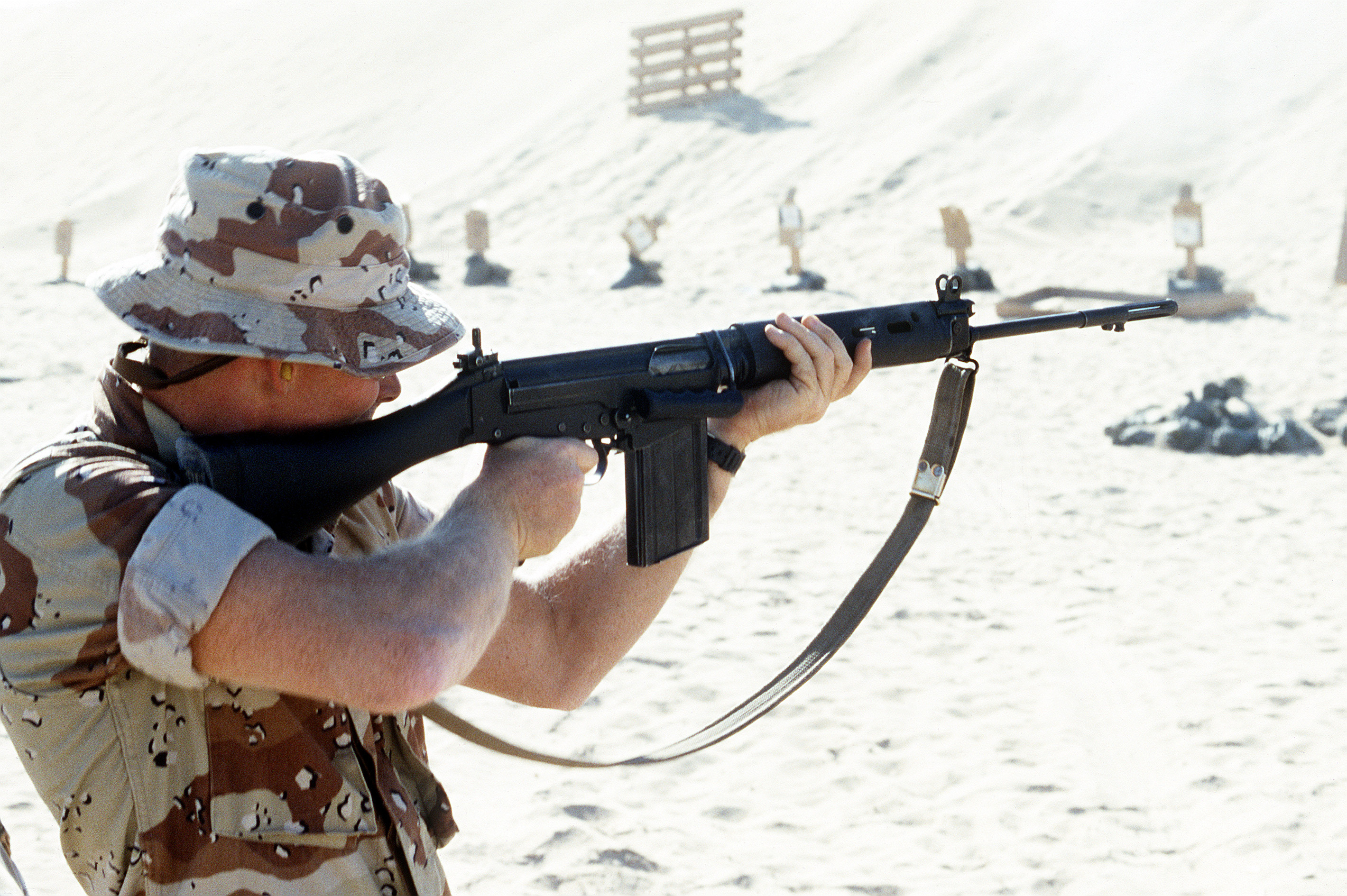
US Marine firing the L1A1 rifle

- Enfield Pattern 1853 Rifle-Musket which used the Minié ball ammunition.
- Snider–Enfield Rifle: an 1866 breech-loading version of the 1853 Enfield.
- Martini–Henry Rifle: breech-loading lever activated rifle, manufactured from 1871 to 1891.
- Enfield revolver: standard issue sidearms, two main versions from 1880 to 1957.
- Martini–Enfield: a conversion of the Martini–Henry rifle to .303 calibre, from 1895.
- Lee–Enfield rifles - using the Lee bolt action. There were 13 variants from 1895 to 1957.
- Pattern 1913 Enfield .276 Enfield experimental rifle, 1913
- Pattern 1914 Enfield Rifle: intended as a Lee–Enfield replacement, mainly used by snipers in World War I.
- Bren (Brno + Enfield), .303 Light machine gun from 1935 onwards.
- Sten (Shepherd, Turpin + Enfield) 9mm Sub-machine gun from 1941 to 1953
- Polsten low cost version of 20 mm Oerlikon (acknowledging two Polish designers + Sten (= Shepherd, Turpin + Enfield)), from 1944.
- Taden gun: .280 calibre experimental machine gun, 1951.
- EM-1: .280 calibre bullpup design experimental assault rifle, 1951.
- EM-2: .280 calibre bullpup design experimental assault rifle, 1951.
- ADEN cannon (Armament Development Establishment + Enfield): 30 mm revolver cannon for aircraft use, entered service in 1954.
- L1A1 SLR, a British FN FAL derivative 7.62 mm Self Loading Rifle, from 1954.
- L42A1, a rebuilt and re-chambered conversion of the Lee–Enfield Rifle No 4 into a 7.62mm sniper rifle; entered service in 1970.
- MCEM 3 submachine gun designed but never went into production
- RARDEN cannon, (Royal Armament Research and Development Establishment + Enfield): 30mm autocannon for light armoured vehicles, entered service in 1971.
- ARWEN 37, (Anti Riot Weapon ENfield): a less lethal 37mm launcher with a rifled barrel to ensure accuracy, designed to be used in crowd control situations.
- SA80 (L85) assault rifle, from 1987.

For weapons manufactured at Enfield before 1853, see British military rifles#Early Enfield rifles

The RSAF, Enfield, was famous for its Pattern Room which was a collection, or master set, of every weapon made at RSAF Enfield. After closure this collection was moved to ROF Nottingham, which has since closed. The collection is now held at the Royal Armouries Museum, Leeds.

== Closure and reuse of the site ==
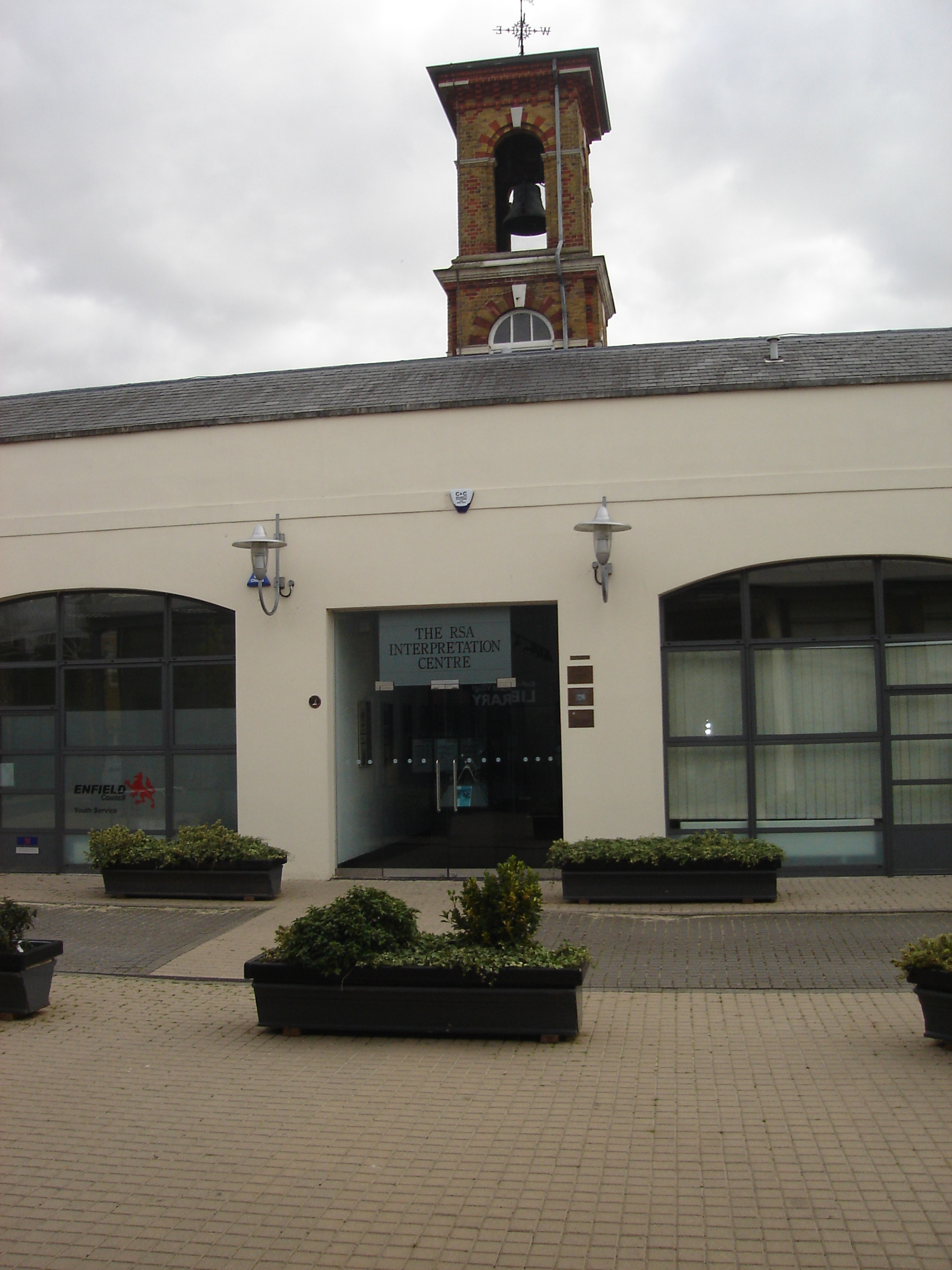
The RSAF Interpretation centre

Local government boundary changes meant that the majority of the site was now within the London Borough of Enfield. The necessary outline planning permissions were obtained for site redevelopment, making closure of the site attractive to its new owners.

Closure was announced in August 1987, shortly after privatisation as Royal Ordnance. The site closed in 1988. The machinery was auctioned off in November 1988. BAe then formed a joint venture with the property company Trafalgar House to redevelop the site.

The majority of the site is now covered by a large housing development called Enfield Island Village. The original machine shop frontage and the older part of the rear structure has been retained and was converted into workshops and retail units by the Enfield Enterprise Agency, making use of European Union (ERDF) funding. The buildings house the RSAF Interpretation centre which can be viewed by appointment only.

The Rifles public house originally known as the Royal Small Arms Tavern was compulsorily purchased by the government during the First World War. It closed down in 2004 after a large fire damaged the structure. The partially destroyed building is currently standing (2015). Other pubs which had been built for local works remain standing including The Greyhound just west of the River Lea and The Plough in Sewardstone.

== Community ==
In 1895, the community had long had its own school (demolished), and a church (demolished in the 1920s), a police station—with three sergeants and nine constables in 1902. A fire brigade was manned by one professional and 32 amateurs. Housing conditions in the mid 19th century were poor in the area. The still extant Government Row, a terrace of cottages, was built between two watercourses to house some of the factory's workers.

Several public houses were opened close to the complex, including The Royal Small Arms Tavern renamed Rifles in the late 20th century, The Greyhound, Ordnance Arms and The Plough. The latter two still survive (2021). The brewers Truman & Hanbury became responsible for the catering within the factory. There is still evidence of the factory in the immediate area, such as pill boxes, bridges and original buildings on the site such as the police house.
