= Breechloader =

Class of gun which is loaded from the breech

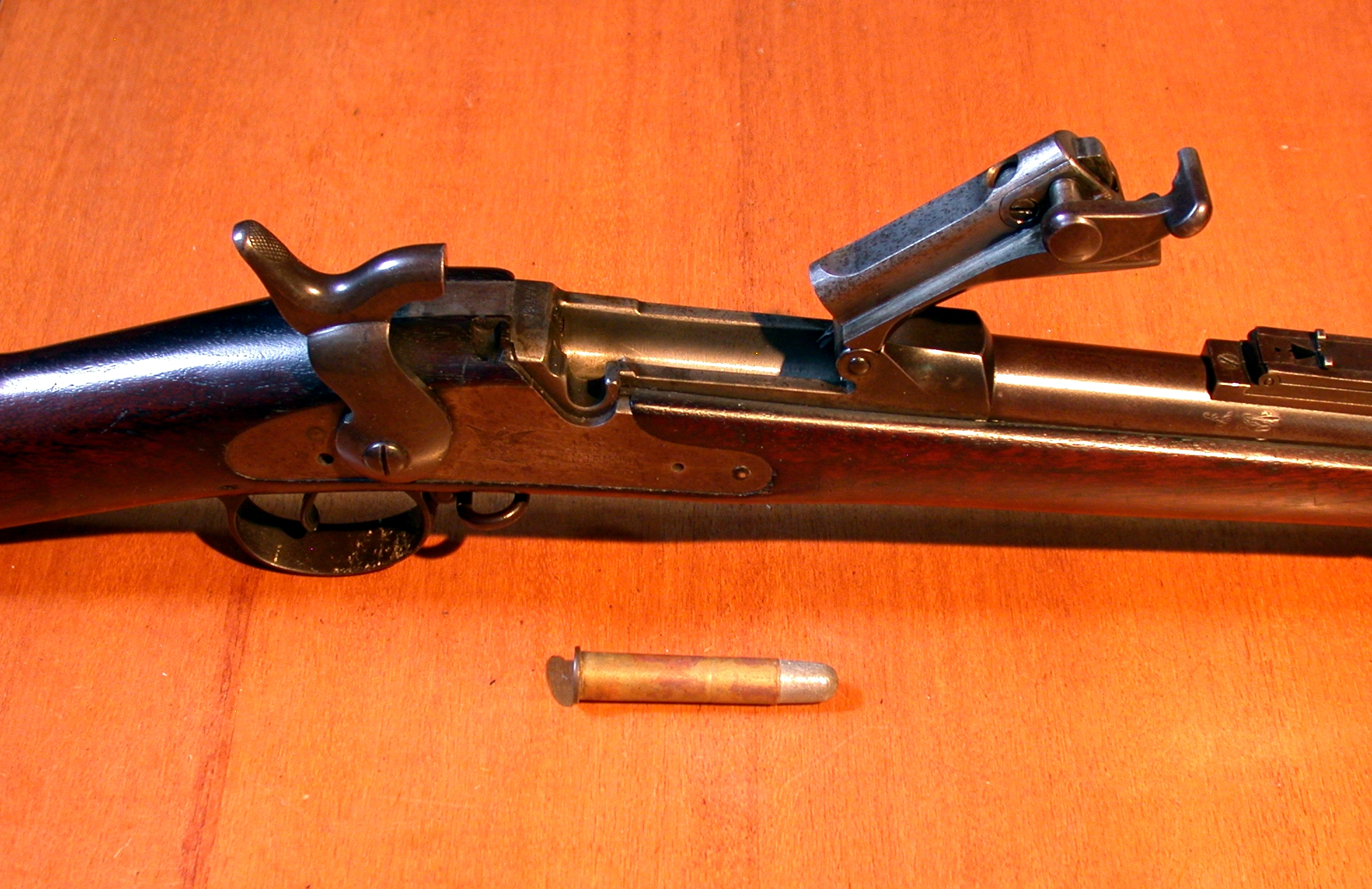
A Springfield Model 1888 rifle with its breech open.

Schematic of various forms of locking on breechloading firearms.

A breechloader is a firearm or artillery piece in which the user loads the ammunition from the breech (rear) end of the barrel. The vast majority of modern firearms are breechloaders.

Before the mid-19th century, most guns were muzzleloaders, guns loaded from the muzzle (front) end of the barrel.

Only a few muzzle-loading weapons, such as mortars, rifle grenades, some rocket launchers, such as the Panzerfaust 3 and RPG-7, and the GP series grenade launchers, have remained in common usage in modern military conflicts. However, referring to a weapon explicitly as breech-loading is mostly limited to weapons in which the operator loads ammunition by hand (and not by operating a mechanism such as a bolt action), such as artillery pieces or break-action small arms.

Breech-loading designs provide several advantages, chief among which is reduced reload time. Rather than having to push propellant and projectile through the whole length of the barrel and pack it down, they can be simply inserted into the chamber far quicker. The reloading process itself is also streamlined, as the weapons do not need to be maneuvered around as much; for artillery, this also allows gun emplacements to be smaller and the crew to remain better protected. Rifled or fouled barrels do not impede loading the breech. Another advantage is that projectiles could be made to fit the bore tightly, increasing power, range and accuracy. Unloading a breechloader is much easier as well, as the ammunition can be unloaded from the breech end, which can often be done by hand. Unloading muzzleloaders requires drilling into the projectile to drag it out through the whole length of the barrel, and in some cases, the guns are simply fired to facilitate the unloading process.

The advent of breechloading gave a significant increase to effective firepower by its own right, and it also enabled further revolutions in firearm designs such as repeating and self-loading firearms.

== History ==
Although breech-loading firearms were developed as far back as the early 14th century in Burgundy and various other parts of Europe, breech-loading became more successful with improvements in precision engineering and machining in the 19th century.

The main challenge for developers of breech-loading firearms was sealing the breech. That was eventually solved for smaller firearms by the development of the self-contained metallic cartridge in the mid-19th century. For firearms that are too large to use cartridges, the problem was solved by the development of the interrupted screw.

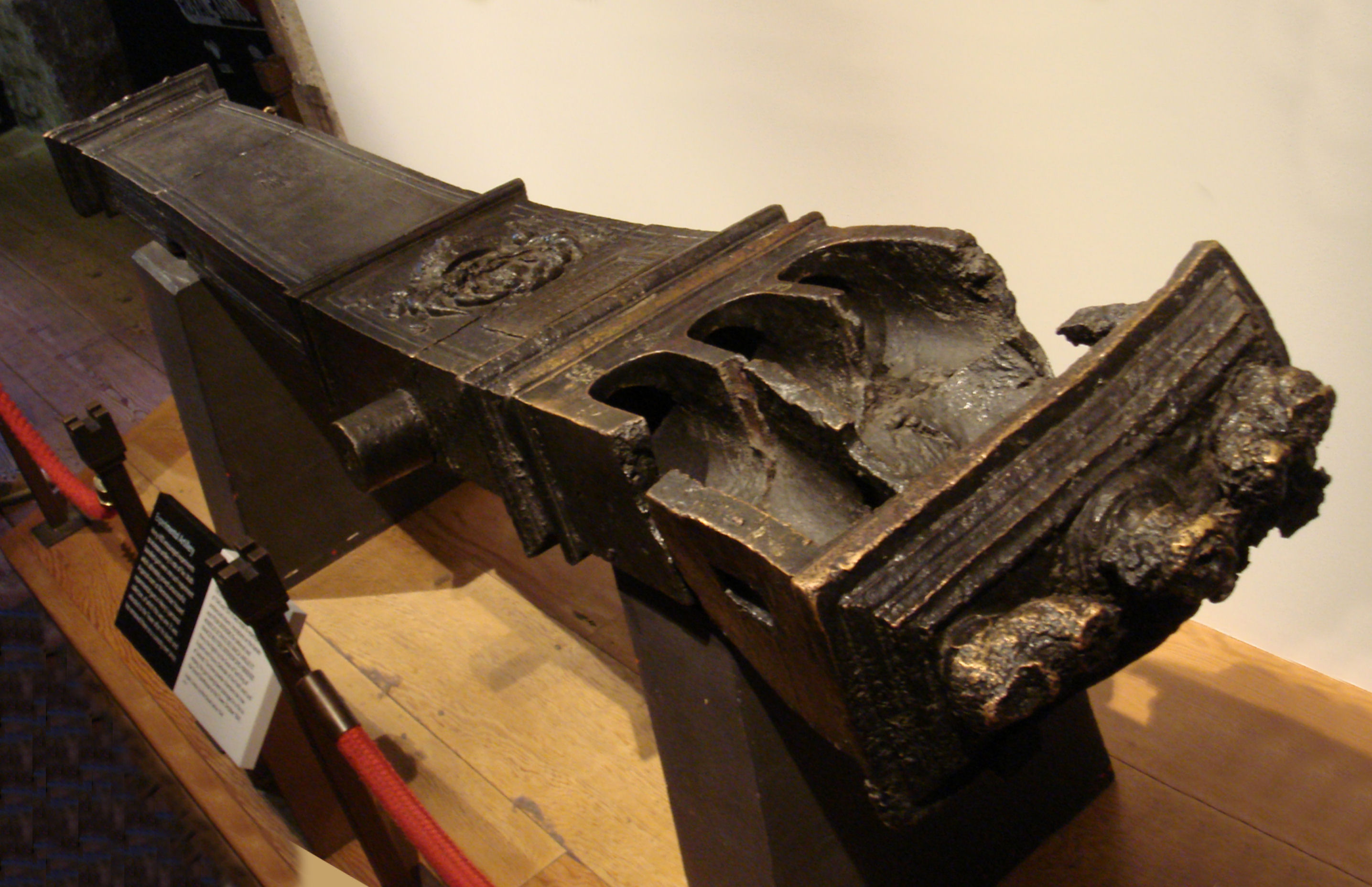
Three-shot experimental breech-loading cannon (burst) belonging to Henry VIII of England, 1540–1543

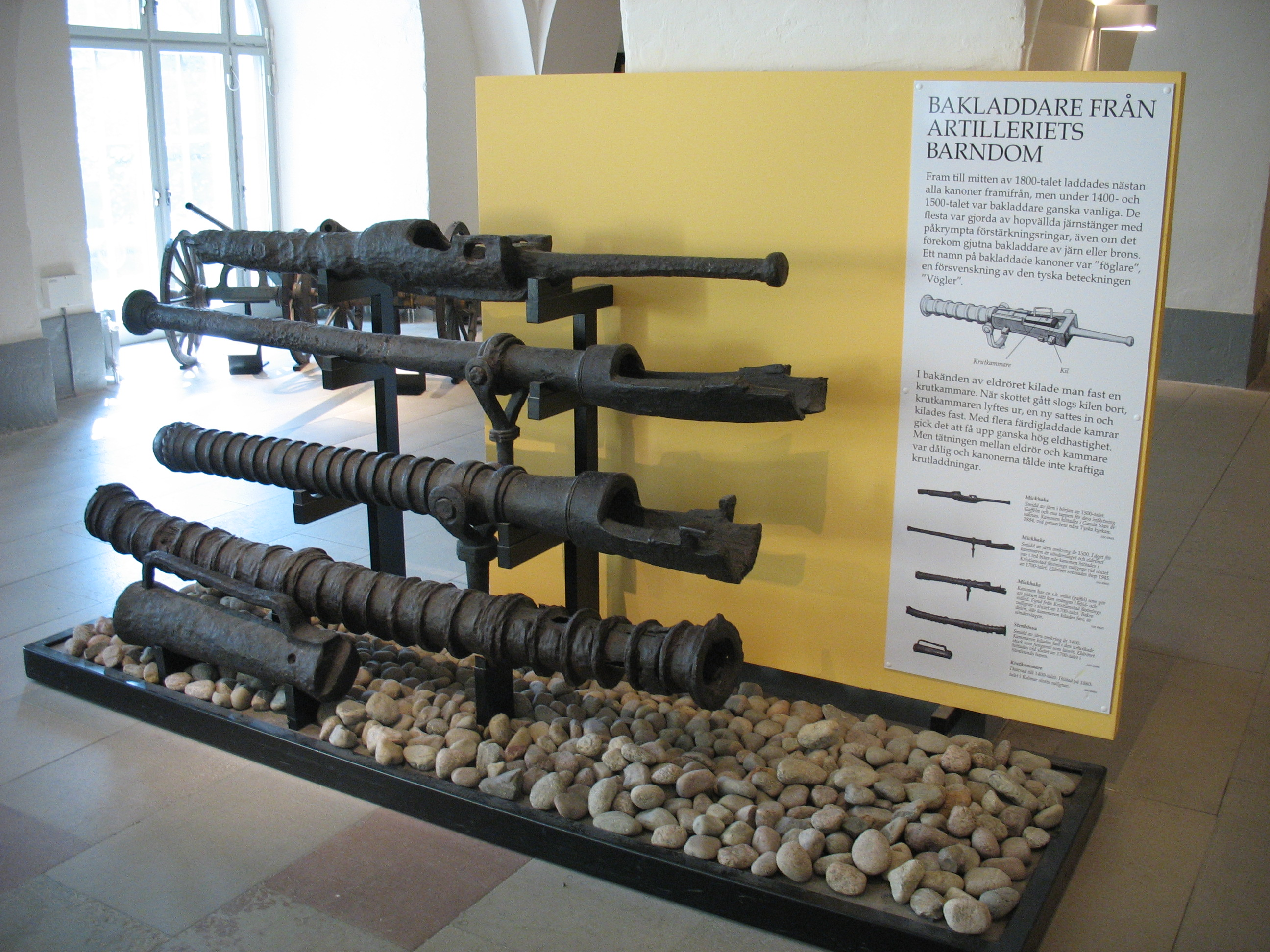
15th and 16th century breech-loaders on display at the Army Museum in Stockholm

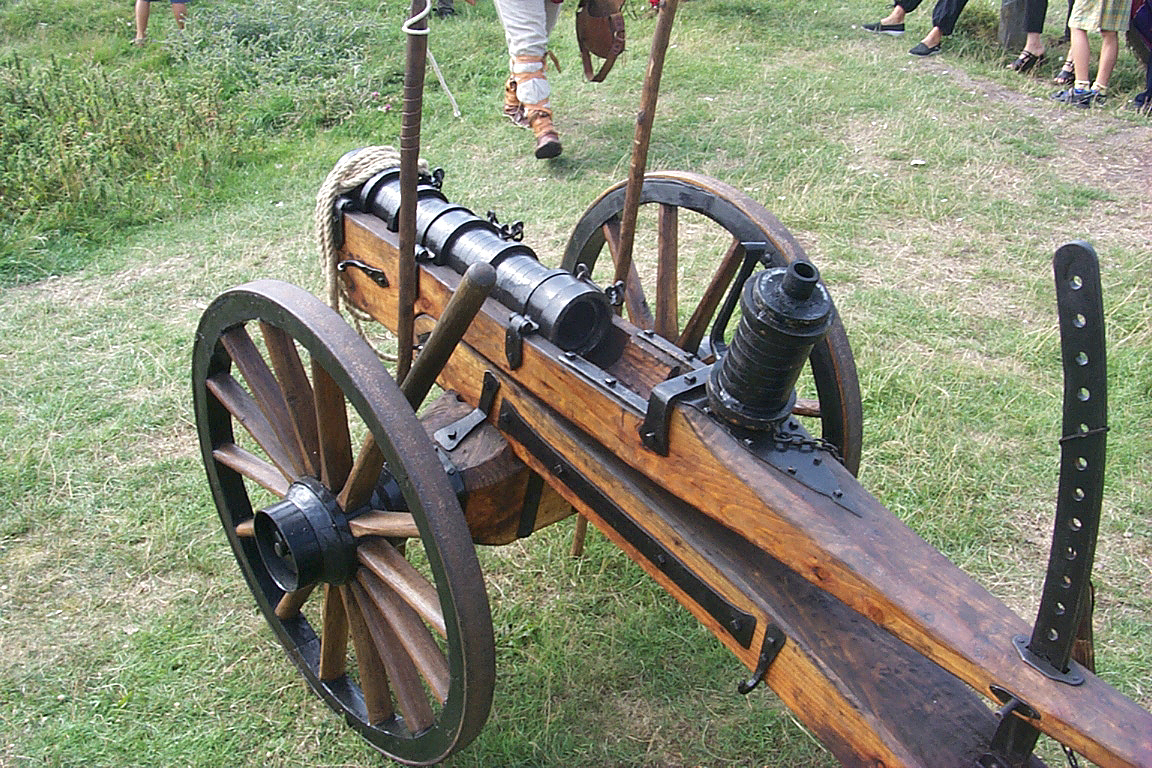
Replica of a medieval Swedish breech-loaded "cart gun" (Swedish: kärrebössa)

=== Swivel guns ===
Breech-loading swivel guns were invented in the 14th century. They were a particular type of swivel gun, and consisted in a small breech-loading cannon equipped with a swivel for easy rotation, loaded by inserting a mug-shaped chamber already filled with powder and projectiles. The breech-loading swivel gun had a high rate of fire, and was especially effective in anti-personnel roles.

=== Firearms ===
==== 16th century (Late Medieval Period) ====
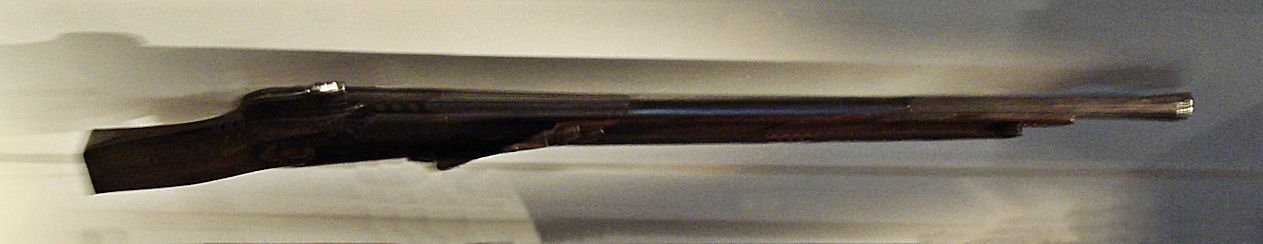
Henry VIII's breech-loading hunting gun, 16th century. The breech block rotates on the left on hinges, and is loaded with a reloadable iron cartridge. Thought to have been used as a hunting gun to shoot birds. The original wheellock mechanism is missing.

Breech-loading firearms are known from the 16th century. Henry VIII possessed one, which he apparently used as a hunting gun to shoot birds. Meanwhile, in China, an early form of breech-loading musket, known as the Che Dian Chong, was known to have been created in the second half of the 16th century for the Ming dynasty's arsenals. Like all early breech-loading fireams, gas leakage was a limitation and danger present in the weapon's mechanism.

==== 18th century (Early Modern Period) ====
More breech-loading firearms were made in the early 18th century. One such gun known to have belonged to Philip V of Spain, and was manufactured circa 1715, probably in Madrid. It came with a ready-to load reusable cartridge.

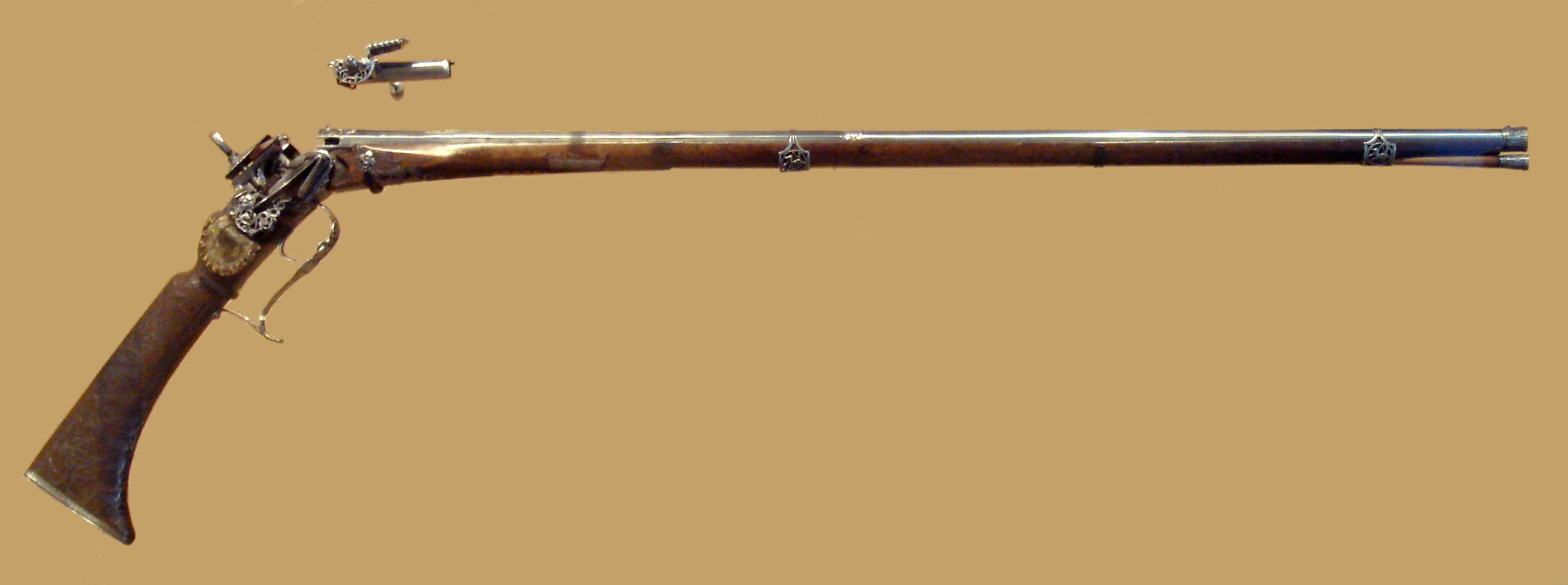
Breech-loading firearm that belonged to Philip V of Spain, made by A. Tienza, Madrid circa 1715. It came with a ready-to-load reusable cartridge. This is a miquelet system.

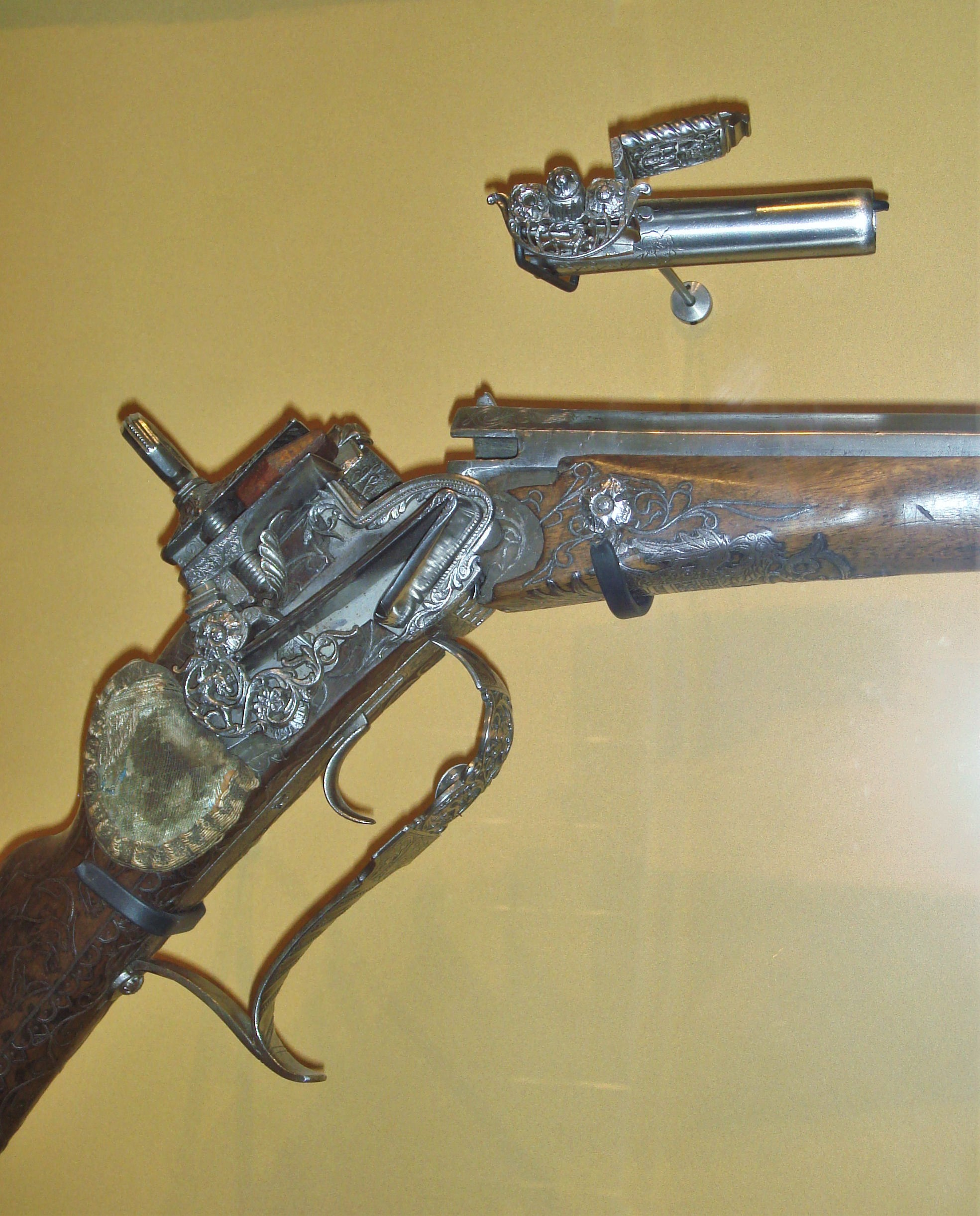
Mechanism of Philip V's breech-loading firearm

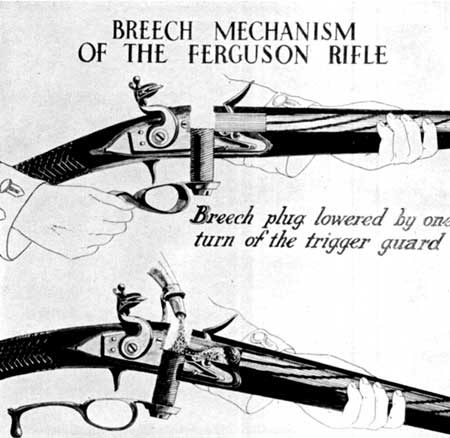
The breech mechanism of the Ferguson rifle

Patrick Ferguson, a British Army officer, developed in 1772 the Ferguson rifle, a breech-loading flintlock firearm. Roughly two hundred of the rifles were manufactured and used in the Battle of Brandywine, during the American Revolutionary War, but shortly after they were retired and replaced with the standard Brown Bess musket.

==== 19th century (Victorian Period) ====
From the late 18th century to early 19th century, and later on into the mid-19th century, there were attempts in Europe at an effective breech-loader. There were concentrated attempts at improved cartridges and methods of ignition.

In Paris in 1808, in association with French gunsmith François Prélat, Jean Samuel Pauly created the first fully self-contained cartridges: the cartridges incorporated a copper base with integrated mercury fulminate primer powder (the major innovation of Pauly), a round bullet and either brass or paper casing. The cartridge was loaded through the breech and fired with a needle. The needle-activated central-fire breech-loading gun would become a major feature of firearms thereafter. The corresponding firearm was also developed by Pauly. Pauly made an improved version, which was protected by a patent on 29 September 1812.

The United States Army adopted the first standard breech-loading rifle, the Hall rifle of 1819, in large quantities.

The Pauly cartridge was further improved by the French gunsmith Casimir Lefaucheux in 1828, by adding a pinfire primer, but Lefaucheux did not register his patent until 1835: a pinfire cartridge containing powder in a cardboard shell.

In 1842, the Norwegian Armed Forces adopted the breech-loading caplock, the Kammerlader, one of the first instances in which a modern army widely adopted a breech-loading rifle as its main infantry firearm.

In 1845, another Frenchman Louis-Nicolas Flobert invented, for indoor shooting, the first rimfire metallic cartridge, constituted by a bullet fit in a percussion cap. Usually derived in the 6 mm and 9 mm calibres, it is since then called the Flobert cartridge but it does not contain any powder; the only propellant substance contained in the cartridge is the percussion cap itself. In English-speaking countries the Flobert cartridge corresponds to the .22 BB and .22 CB ammunitions.

In 1846, yet another Frenchman, Benjamin Houllier, patented the first fully metallic cartridge containing powder in a metallic shell. Houllier commercialised his weapons in association with the gunsmiths Blanchard or Charles Robert. But the subsequent Houllier and Lefaucheux cartridges, even if they were the first full-metal shells, were still pinfire cartridges, like those used in the LeMat (1856) and Lefaucheux (1858) revolvers, although the LeMat also evolved in a revolver using rimfire cartridges.

The Dreyse Zündnadelgewehr (Dreyse needle gun) was a single-shot breech-loading rifle using a rotating bolt to seal the breech. It was so called because of its .5-inch needle-like firing pin, which passed through a paper cartridge case to impact a percussion cap at the bullet base. It began development in the 1830s under Johann Nicolaus von Dreyse and eventually an improved version of it was adopted by Prussia in the late 1840s. The paper cartridge and the gun had numerous deficiencies; specifically, serious problems with gas leaking. However, the rifle was used to great success in the Prussian army in the Austro-Prussian War of 1866. This, and the Franco-Prussian War of 1870–71, eventually caused much interest in Europe for breech-loaders and the Prussian military system in general.

The first centrefire cartridge was introduced in 1855 by Pottet, with both Berdan and Boxer priming.

In 1860, the New Zealand government petitioned the Colonial Office for more soldiers to defend Auckland. The bid was unsuccessful and the government began instead making inquiries to Britain to obtain modern weapons. In 1861 they placed orders for the Calisher and Terry carbine, which used a breech-loading system using a bullet consisting of a standard Minié lead bullet in .54 calibre backed by a charge and tallowed wad, wrapped in nitrated paper to keep it waterproof. The carbine had been issued in small numbers to English cavalry (Hussars) from 1857. About 3–4,000 carbines were brought into New Zealand a few years later. The carbine was used extensively by the Forest Rangers, an irregular force led by Gustavus von Tempsky that specialized in bush warfare and reconnaissance. Von Tempsky liked the short carbine, which could be loaded while lying down. The waterproofed cartridge was easier to keep dry in the New Zealand bush. Museums in New Zealand hold a small number of these carbines in good condition.

During the American Civil War, at least nineteen types of breech-loaders were fielded. The Sharps used a successful dropping block design. The Greene used rotating bolt-action, and was fed from the breech. The Spencer, which used lever-actuated bolt-action, was fed from a seven-round detachable tube magazine. The Henry and Volcanic used rimfire metallic cartridges fed from a tube magazine under the barrel. These held a significant advantage over muzzle-loaders. The improvements in breech-loaders had spelled the end of muzzle-loaders. To make use of the enormous number of war surplus muzzle-loaders, the Allin conversion Springfield was adopted in 1866. General Burnside invented a breech-loading rifle before the war, the Burnside carbine.

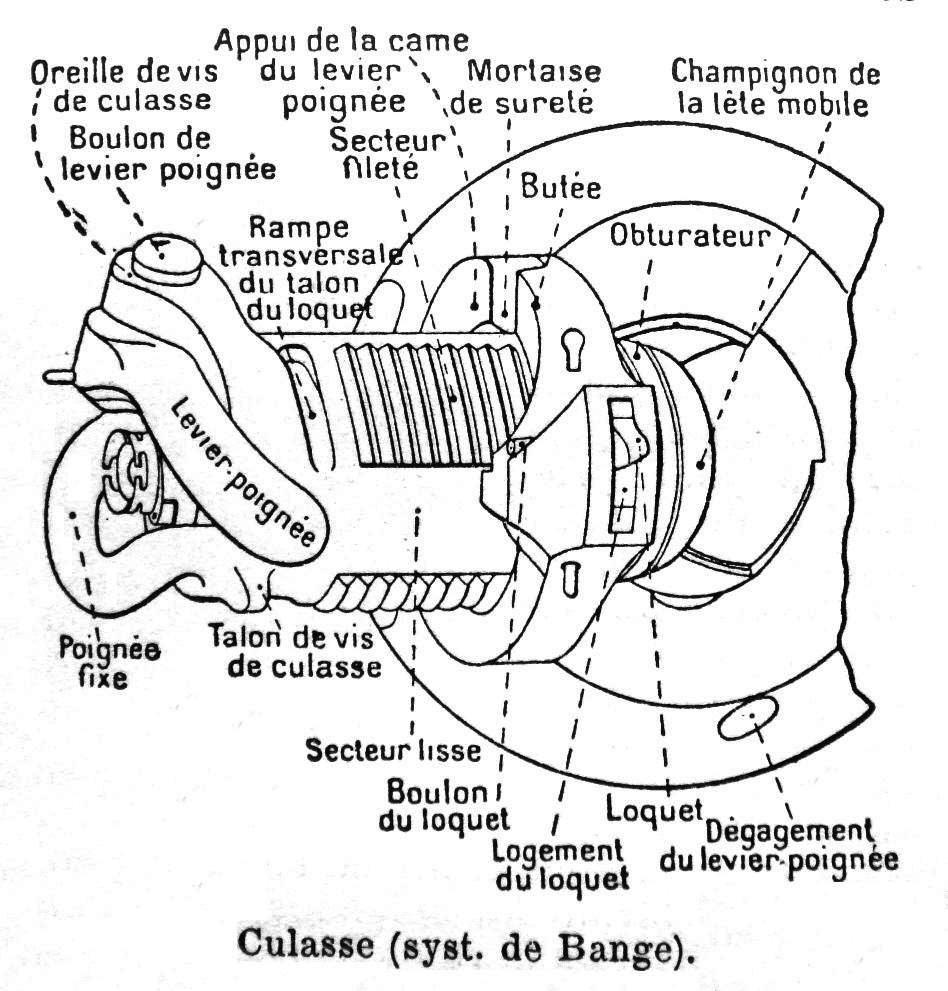
de Bange breech

The French adopted the new Chassepot rifle in 1866, which was much improved over the Dreyse needle gun as it had dramatically fewer gas leaks due to its de Bange sealing system. The British initially took the existing Enfield and fitted it with a Snider breech action (solid block, hinged parallel to the barrel) firing the Boxer cartridge. Following a competitive examination of 104 guns in 1866, the British decided to adopt the Peabody-derived Martini-Henry with trap-door loading in 1871.

Single-shot breech-loaders would be used throughout the latter half of the 19th Century, but were slowly replaced by various designs for repeating rifles, first used in the American Civil War. Manual breech-loaders gave way to manual magazine feed and then to self-loading rifles.

=== Artillery ===
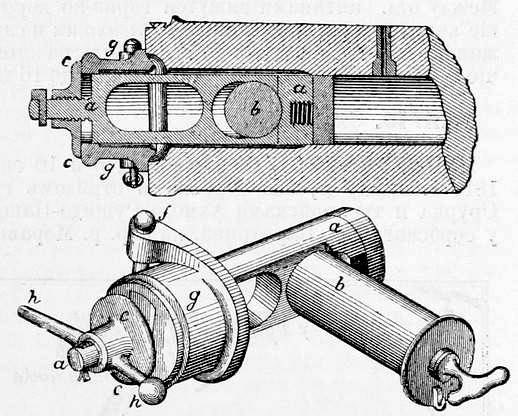
Wahrendorff breech

The first modern breech-loading rifled gun is a breech-loader invented by Martin von Wahrendorff with a cylindrical breech plug secured by a horizontal wedge in 1837. In the 1850s and 1860s, Joseph Whitworth and William Armstrong invented improved breech-loading artillery, the 12-pounder Whitworth rifle and the Armstrong gun.

The M1867 naval guns produced in Imperial Russia at the Obukhov State Plant used Krupp technology.

== Breech mechanism ==
A breech action is the loading sequence of a breech loading naval gun or small arm. The earliest breech actions were either three-shot break-open actions or a barrel tip-down, remove the plug and reload actions. The later breech-loaders included the Ferguson rifle, which used a screw-in/screw out action to reload, and the Hall rifle, which tipped up at 30 degrees for loading. The better breech loaders, however, used percussion caps, including the Sharps rifle, using a falling block (or sliding block) action to reload. And then later on came the Dreyse needle gun that used a moving seal (bolt) to seal and expose the breech. Later on, however, the Mauser M71/84 rifle used self-contained metallic cartridges and used a rotating bolt to open and close the breech.

== See also ==
- Breechblock
- Interrupted screw
- Rifled musket
- Rifled breechloader
