= .17 PMC/Aguila =

Rimfire cartridge

.17 Aguila
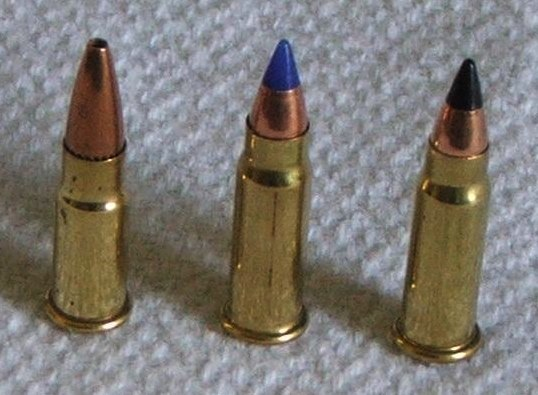
- .17 PMC/Aguila left. .17 HM2 center and right.
- Type: Rifle
- Place of origin: Mexico

Production history
- Designer: Efrain Peralta / Aguila
- Designed: 2003
- Manufacturer: Aguila
- Produced: 2004–present

Specifications
- Parent case: .22 LR
- Case type: Rimmed, bottleneck
- Bullet diameter: .172 in (4.4 mm)
- Rim diameter: .271 in (6.9 mm)
- Rim thickness: .039 in (0.99 mm)
- Case length: .591 in (15.0 mm)
- Overall length: .984 in (25.0 mm)
- Primer type: Rimfire
- Maximum pressure: 20,000 psi (179.264 MPa)

Ballistic performance
Bullet mass/type	Velocity	Energy
20 gr (1 g) jacketed solid point	1,850 ft/s (560 m/s)	152 ft⋅lbf (206 J)
- Test barrel length: 24; Source: Jesse's Hunting web site

The .17 PMC/Aguila, also known as the .17 High Standard, is a rimfire cartridge formed by necking down the .22 Long Rifle casing to accept a .172" diameter bullet. This cartridge was developed in 2003 by firearms maker High Standard and ammunition maker Aguila Ammunition and was introduced in 2004. The introduction was ill-timed, however, coming in the middle of the introduction of two major new .17 rimfire cartridges from Hornady, which were the .17 HMR in 2002 and the .17 HM2 in 2004, which dominated the .17 caliber rimfire market in the early 21st century.

The .17 PMC/Aguila can be shot in a rifle that is chambered for .17 HM2, but not the other way around.

== See also ==
- List of handgun cartridges
- List of rifle cartridges
- 4 mm caliber
