= 5mm Remington Rimfire Magnum =

Bottlenecked rimfire cartridge introduced by Remington Arms Company

5 mm Remington Rimfire Magnum
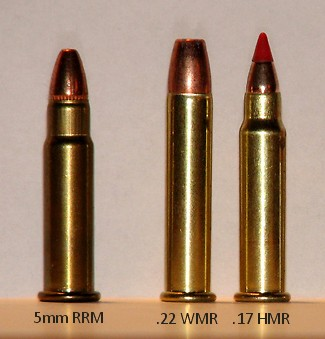
- 5 mm RRM (left), .22 WMR (center) and .17 HMR (right).
- Type: Rifle
- Place of origin: United States

Production history
- Designer: Remington Arms Company
- Designed: 1969
- Manufacturer: Remington
- Produced: 1969–1973 (original production); 1974–1982 (limited/seasonal production); 2008–present (current production)

Specifications
- Case type: Rimmed, bottleneck
- Bullet diameter: .204 in (5.2 mm)
- Neck diameter: .225 in (5.7 mm)
- Shoulder diameter: .259 in (6.6 mm)
- Base diameter: .259 in (6.6 mm)
- Rim diameter: .325 in (8.3 mm)
- Rim thickness: .050 in (1.3 mm)
- Case length: 1.020 in (25.9 mm)
- Overall length: 1.30 in (33 mm)
- Primer type: Rimfire
- Maximum pressure (SAAMI): 33,000–37,000 psi (230–260 MPa)

Ballistic performance
| Bullet mass/type | Velocity | Energy |
|---|---|---|
| 38 gr. (2.5 g) Lead | 2,100 ft/s (640 m/s) | 372 ft⋅lbf (504 J) |
| 30 gr. (1.9 g) JHP | 2,410 ft/s (730 m/s) | 410 ft⋅lbf (560 J) |
- Sources: "Cartridges of the World",

The 5mm Remington Rimfire Magnum or 5mm RFM is a bottlenecked rimfire cartridge introduced by Remington Arms Company in 1969. Remington chambered it in a pair of bolt-action rifles, the Model 591 and Model 592, but this ammunition never became very popular, and the rifles were discontinued in 1974. About 52,000 rifles and 30,000 barrels for the Thompson/Center Contender pistol were sold during its brief production run. Remington discontinued the cartridge itself after several limited/seasonal production runs from 1974 to 1982, leaving owners with no source of ammunition for their rifles.

In 2008, the cartridge was reintroduced by Aguila Ammunition in collaboration with Centurion Ordnance.

== Design ==
Remington designed a completely new, bottlenecked case that was somewhat similar to the older .22 Winchester Magnum, but stronger to handle the higher chamber pressure of the 5 mm (0.20 in) at 37,000 psi (260 MPa), the chamber pressure was then lowered to its current 33,000 psi (230 MPa) when Aguila Ammunition started manufacturering new limited/seasonal production runs of the rimfire cartridge in 2008.

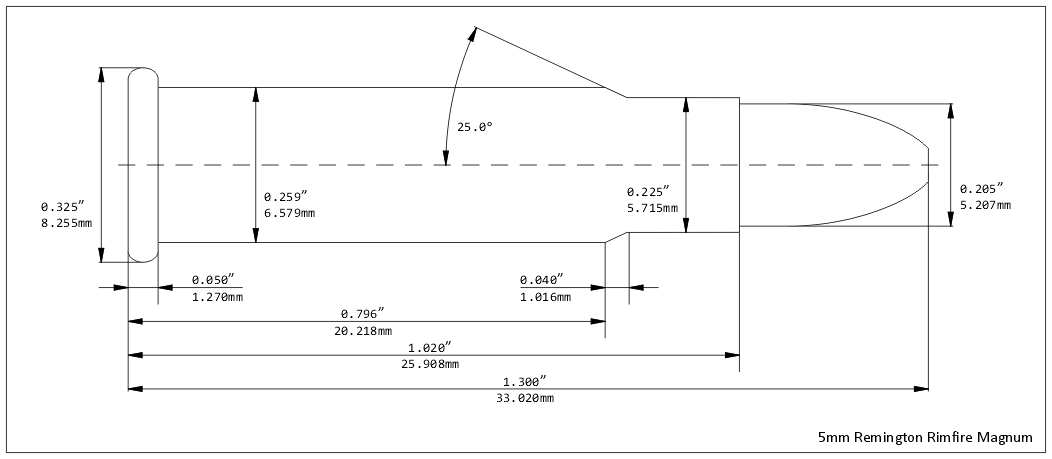

Between 1983 and 2007, no ammunition was being manufactured. Some firearms manufacturers even created conversion kits to allow the existing 5mm RFM guns to shoot other more-common cartridges.

At the 2008 SHOT Show, Aguila Ammunition announced it would reintroduce the cartridge and begin commercial production of 5mm RFM ammunition. Until 2019, the cartridges were sold in the United States of America under the Centurion brand. In 2019, Aguila Ammunition announced the company now offered two 5mm RFM loads: one with a semi-jacketed hollow point bullet and a second with a full jacketed hollow point bullet. Both loads use a 30 gr (1.9 g) projectile and have a muzzle velocity of 2,300 ft/s (700 m/s).

== Performance ==
The 5mm RFM offers higher velocity and more energy than the older .22 WMR and the newer .17 HMR. It offers improved performance on small game and for varmint hunting, along with excellent accuracy.

5mm RFM Performance Comparison
| Weight (grains) | Name | Brand | Type | Velocity (ft/s) | | | | | Energy (ft⋅lbf) | | | | | Trajectory (in) | | | | |
| Weight (grains) | Name | Brand | Type | 0 yd | 50 yd | 100 yd | 150 yd | 200 yd | 0 yd | 50 yd | 100 yd | 150 yd | 200 yd | 0 yd | 50 yd | 100 yd | 150 yd | 200 yd |
|---|---|---|---|---|---|---|---|---|---|---|---|---|---|---|---|---|---|---|
| 17 gr (1.1 g) | .17 HMR | Remington | AccuTip-V | 2,550 ft/s (780 m/s) | 2,380 ft/s (730 m/s) | 1,900 ft/s (580 m/s) | 1,620 ft/s (490 m/s) | 1,378 ft/s (420 m/s) | 245 ft⋅lbf (332 J) | 185 ft⋅lbf (251 J) | 136 ft⋅lbf (184 J) | 99 ft⋅lbf (134 J) | 72 ft⋅lbf (98 J) | 0 in (0 cm) | +0.1 in (0.25 cm) | 0 in (0 cm) | −2.6 in (−6.6 cm) | N/A |
| 38 gr (2.5 g) | 5 mm RFM | Remington | C.L. HP | 2,100 ft/s (640 m/s) | N/A | 1,605 ft/s (489 m/s) | 1,400 ft/s (430 m/s) | N/A | 372 ft⋅lbf (504 J) | N/A | 217 ft⋅lbf (294 J) | 165 ft⋅lbf (224 J) | N/A | 0 in (0 cm) | N/A | 0 in (0 cm) | −4.3 in (−11 cm) | N/A |
| 33 gr (2.1 g) | .22 WMR | Remington | AccuTip-V | 2,000 ft/s (610 m/s) | 1,703 ft/s (519 m/s) | 1,495 ft/s (456 m/s) | N/A | N/A | 293 ft⋅lbf (397 J) | 219 ft⋅lbf (297 J) | 164 ft⋅lbf (222 J) | N/A | N/A | 0 in (0 cm) | +0.6 in (1.5 cm) | 0 in (0 cm) | −4.5 in (−11 cm) | N/A |

== 5mm Craig Centerfire conversion ==
When Remington discontinued production of 5mm RFM ammunition, owners of Remington 591 and 592 rifles were left with excellent rifles but no ammunition for them. In 1994, Mike Craig from Seattle, Washington began working on a centerfire conversion of the 5mm RFM, this new cartridge conversion was called the 5mm Craig Centerfire.

== Firearms chambered for 5 mm RRM ==
For a brief time, Thompson Center Arms offered to chamber Thompson/Center Contender barrels in the 5mm Remington Magnum Rimfire cartridge, which in turn they produced around 30,000 of them in total.

At the 2008 SHOT show, Taurus International introduced the first handgun chambered for the 5mm Remington Magnum Rimfire.

== See also ==
- Rimfire ammunition
- List of rifle cartridges
- List of handgun cartridges
- Table of handgun and rifle cartridges
- 5 mm caliber
