= Aguila Ammunition =

Firearms cartridges manufacturer based in Mexico

Industrias Tecnos S.A. de C.V.
- Aguila Ammuition®, the main brand of Industrias Tecnos
- Company type: Public company
- Industry: Ammunition
- Founded: 1961
- Headquarters: Km 6 Carr. Tepoztlán-Cuernavaca Cuernavaca 62000 Morelos, Mexico
- Products: Cartridges
- Website: www.aguilaammo.com
- Footnotes / references RFC: ITE810721DP3

Aguila Ammunition is a Mexican manufacturer of firearms cartridges, under Industrias Tecnos of Cuernavaca. Industrias Tecnos was established in 1961, under the name Cartuchos Deportivos de México (It was changed to Tecnos in 1978), as a manufacturer of sporting and rimfire cartridges in collaboration with the American Remington Arms.

== Notable Products ==
- the .22 SSS (Sniper SubSonic) cartridge, a very heavy .22LR cartridge that creates no sonic crack
- .22 Colibri, a short .22 rimfire with a primer but no propellant
- .17 PMC/Aguila
- 12 gauge Minishell
