= Remington Rider Single Shot Pistol =

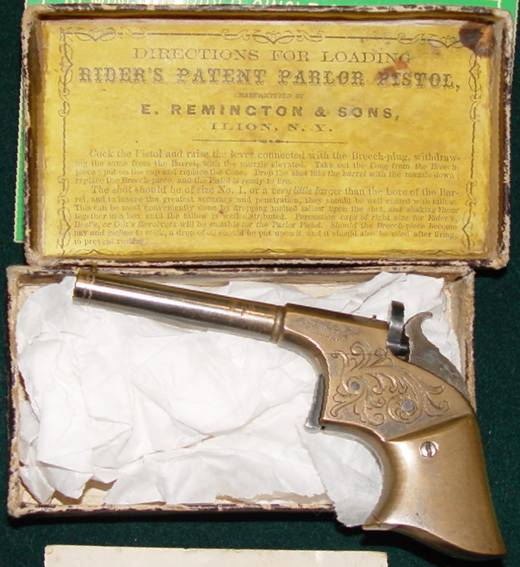
- Type: Single Shot Derringer
- Place of origin: United States

Production history
- Manufacturer: E. Remington and Sons
- Produced: 1860–1863
- No. built: Fewer than 200

Specifications
- Barrel length: 3 in (76.2 mm)
- Caliber: .17 (4.3 mm)
- Action: Percussion cap, breech loaded, powderless

The Remington-Rider Single Shot Derringer Parlor Pistol was made by E. Remington and Sons between 1860 and 1863. Only two hundred were produced.

== Description ==
It is a .17 (4.3 mm) caliber pistol, featuring a three-inch (7.6 cm) brass barrel, a two-piece breech, a brass grip, wrapped in a silver plate finish. No serial numbers or barrel markings were printed on the pistols. Fewer than 40 original examples are known to exist today, including two prototypes and several larger model examples.

It is the smallest Remington Pistol ever made and was produced for only three years; the total estimated production quantity is less than two hundred. Not made for use with powder propellants, this diminutive sidearm launches 4.3 mm projectiles at surprisingly high velocities with the use of a percussion cap only.

On September 13, 1859, Joseph Rider was issued patent 25,470 for the Remington-Rider Pistol; this patent is commemorated by the gang stamp RIDER'S PT. SEPT 13, 1859 on the left side of the barrel. The frame, grips, and 3-inch barrel were integrally constructed of sand-cast brass. Some of the known examples have a natural bronze or silver-plated finish; a few are engraved. Only one is known to be rifled; this one is also the most profusely engraved, inscribed and dated and is probably unique.

== Purpose ==
These little pistols were intended to be a parlor pistol and not a defensive weapon. They are designed for use with a percussion cap and lead shot, without gunpowder. There are two types of breech-pieces, about equal in frequency in existing production guns; all known prototypes have the one-piece design, which provides no cover to enclose the cap, and its locking lever is quite short. It was also rumoured to have been used by spies. The two-piece design has a cone to hold the cap, a cover providing protection from the exploding cap, and a longer lever.
