= .17 HM2 =

Rimfire cartridge

.17 Hornady Mach 2
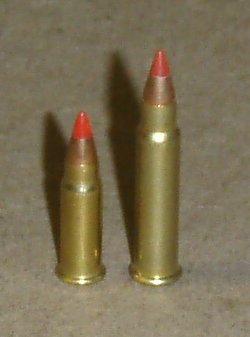
- Left: .17 HM2, Right: .17 HMR
- Type: Rifle
- Place of origin: United States

Production history
- Designer: Hornady
- Designed: 2004
- Manufacturer: CCI/Hornady/Eley
- Produced: 2004–present

Specifications
- Parent case: .22 LR Stinger
- Case type: Rimmed, bottleneck
- Bullet diameter: .172 in (4.4 mm)
- Land diameter: .168 in (4.3 mm)
- Neck diameter: .180 in (4.6 mm)
- Shoulder diameter: .226 in (5.7 mm)
- Base diameter: .226 in (5.7 mm)
- Rim diameter: .275 in (7.0 mm)
- Rim thickness: .043 in (1.1 mm)
- Case length: .714 in (18.1 mm)
- Overall length: 1.00 in (25 mm)
- Primer type: Rimfire
- Maximum pressure: 24,000 psi (170 MPa)

Ballistic performance
Bullet mass/type	Velocity	Energy
17 gr (1 g) V-Max	2,100 ft/s (640 m/s)	166 ft⋅lbf (225 J)

The .17 Hornady Mach 2, commonly known as the .17 HM2, is a rimfire cartridge introduced in 2004 by the ammunition manufacturer Hornady, following the successful launch in 2002 of the .17 HMR. The .17 HM2 is based on the .22 Long Rifle "Stinger" case, necked down to .17 caliber (4.5 mm) and using a bullet weighing less than half the weight of a typical .22 Long Rifle bullet.

== Performance ==
The weight of the bullet is a key part of achieving a very high velocity for a rimfire round. It weighs only 17 grains (1.10 g) vs 30-40 grains (1.94-2.59 g) of a typical .22 LR bullet. The .17 HM2 may or may not live up to its "Mach 2" name, depending on geographic location and conditions, with velocities out of a rifle of 2,100 ft/s (640 m/s). The velocity is nearly double that of a standard .22 LR, which results in a much flatter trajectory out to its 175-yard (160 m) effective range.

== Converting rifles ==
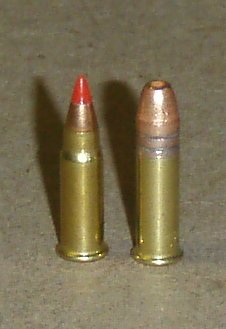
Left: .17HM2, right: .22 LR

Since the .17 HM2 is based on the .22 LR, converting most bolt action firearms chambered in .22 LR to .17 HM2 requires only a barrel change. The higher chamber pressure makes conversion of semi-automatic firearms more difficult, as virtually all are blowback designs that are sensitive to pressure changes. Conversion kits have appeared, and they replace the factory bolt or bolt handle with a heavier one to increase the bolt mass and compensate for the higher chamber pressure.

== See also ==
- .17 PMC/Aguila
- List of handgun cartridges
- List of rifle cartridges
- List of rimfire cartridges
- Table of handgun and rifle cartridges
- 4 mm caliber
