= Gallery gun =

Type of firearm

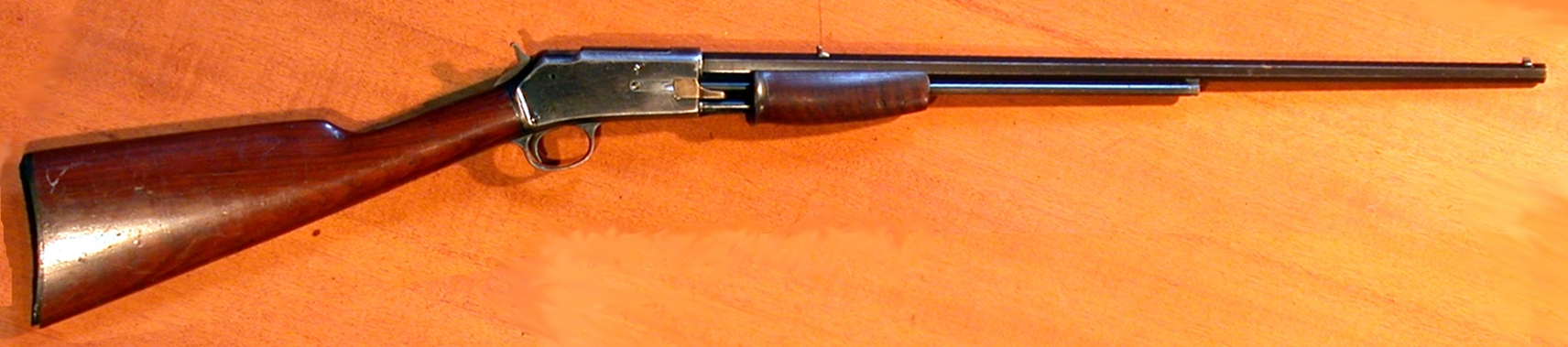
Colt Lightning gallery gun

A gallery gun, Flobert gun, parlor gun or saloon gun is a type of firearm designed for recreational indoor target shooting. These guns were developed in 1845, when French inventor Louis-Nicolas Flobert created the first rimfire metallic cartridge by modifying a percussion cap to hold a small lead bullet. In the 19th century, gallery guns were typically pump-action rifles chambered in .22 Short. Gallery guns are still manufactured, although by the late 20th century, they have been eclipsed by airguns for the purpose of indoor shooting.

== Gallery guns ==
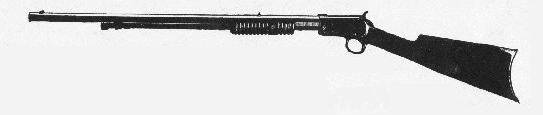
Winchester Model 1890 gallery gun

Gallery guns are smallbore, single-shot or pump-action rifles, typically chambered in .22 Short. Some of the more popular guns are the Winchester Model 1890, Colt Lightning Carbine, Gevarm open bolt and the Winchester Model 62. Home shooting parlors and galleries began to decline in the early 20th century. However, gallery guns went on to be used in shooting galleries in carnivals, fairs and amusement parks. By the late 20th century, gallery guns have been eclipsed by airguns for the purpose of indoor shooting. Gallery guns are still manufactured, although they are primarily used for plinking and small game hunting.

== Flobert guns ==
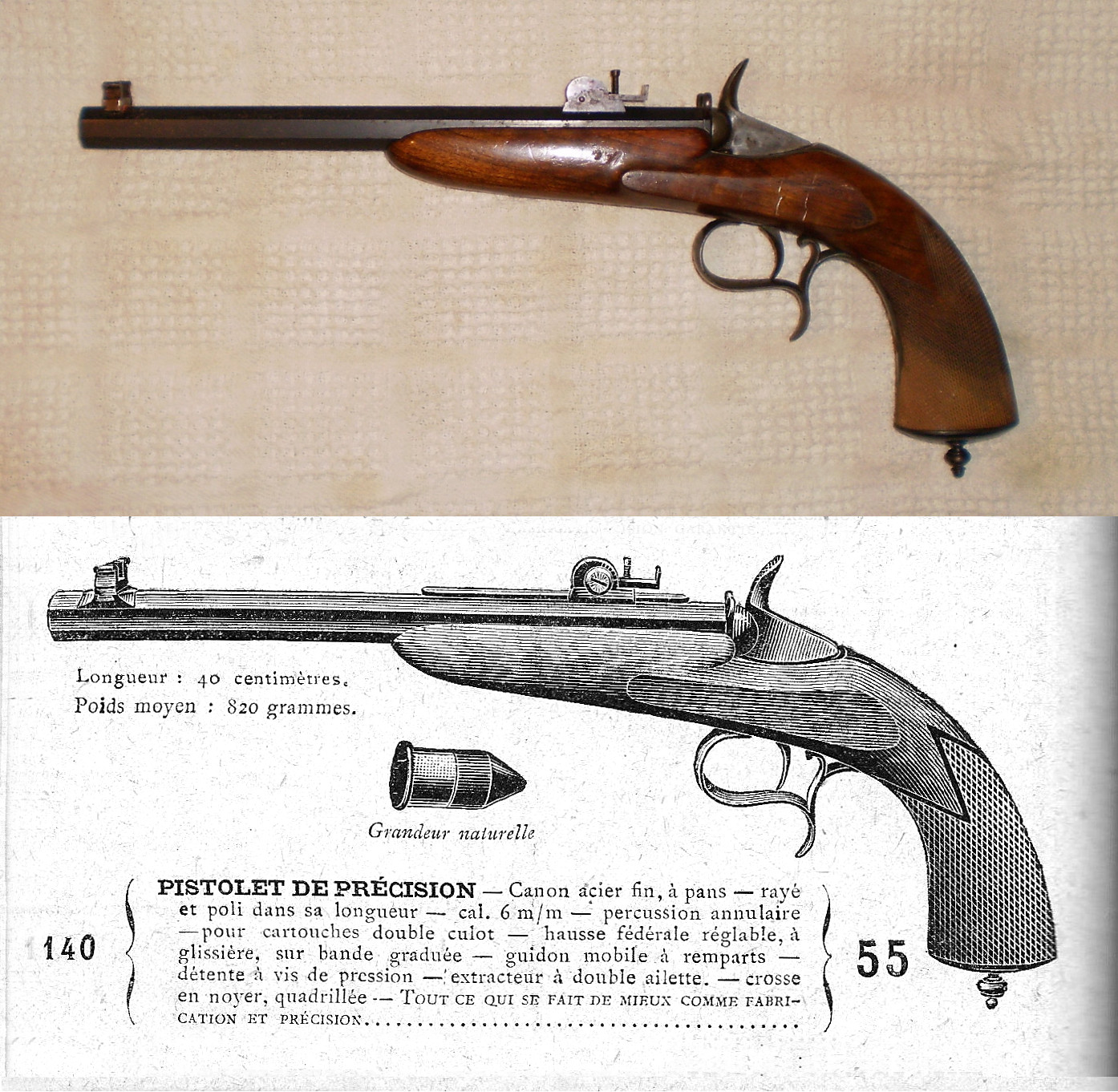
Picture of a 6mm Flobert pistol, together with its description in the 1912 catalogue of the Manufacture Française d'Armes et de Cycles de Saint Étienne

Frenchman Louis-Nicolas Flobert invented the first rimfire metallic cartridge in 1845. The 6mm Flobert cartridge consisted of a percussion cap with a bullet attached to the top. These cartridges do not contain any powder, the only propellant substance contained in the cartridge is the percussion cap. In Europe, the .22 BB cap (introduced in 1845) and the slightly more powerful .22 CB cap (introduced in 1888) are both called "6mm Flobert" and are considered the same cartridge. These cartridges have a relatively low muzzle velocity of around 700 ft/s (213 m/s) to 800 ft/s (244 m/s). Flobert also made what he called "parlor guns" for this cartridge, as these rifles and pistols were designed to be shot in indoor shooting parlors in large homes.

== Parlor pistols ==
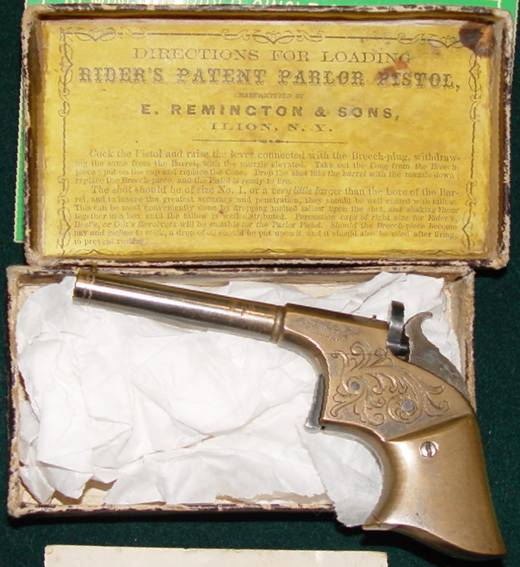
Remington Rider single shot pistol

Parlor pistols came into fashion in the mid-19th century; they typically featured heavy barrels and were chambered in a small caliber. They were used for target shooting in homes with a dedicated parlor or gallery for this purpose. The Remington Rider single shot pistol was one of the better-known American-made parlor guns.

== Saloon gun ==
Saloon guns were smoothbore weapons that fired 6mm Flobert rounds, but can refer to a large caliber firearm that was made to shoot a smaller caliber round in indoor shooting galleries by use of a chamber insert called a Morris tube. The Morris tube was shaped to the cartridge that the weapon was capable of firing and inside this tube was a smaller chamber for the round (typically .255 Morris) to fit.
