= Che Dian Chong =

Musket invented in Ming dynasty China

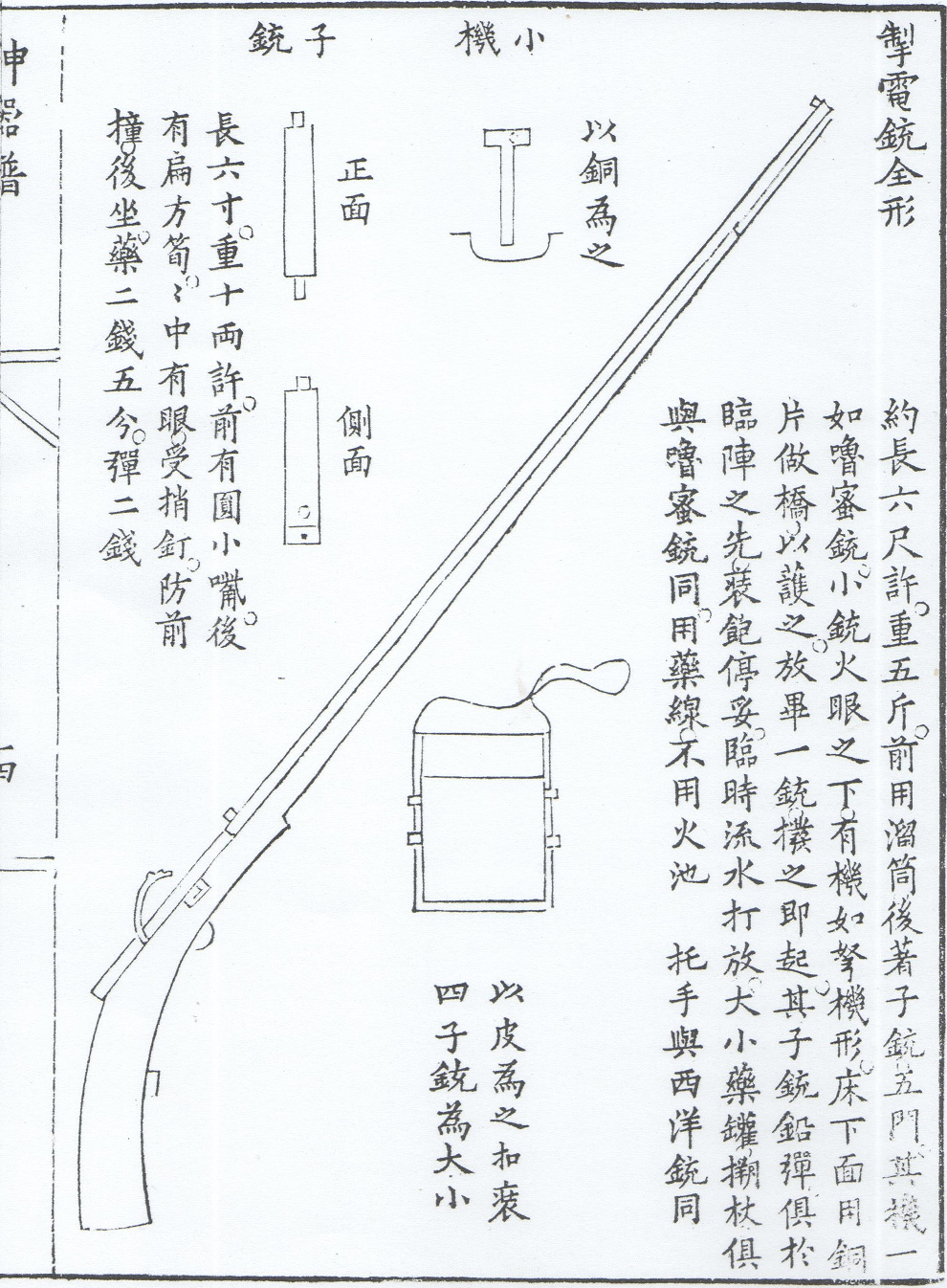
The che dian chong

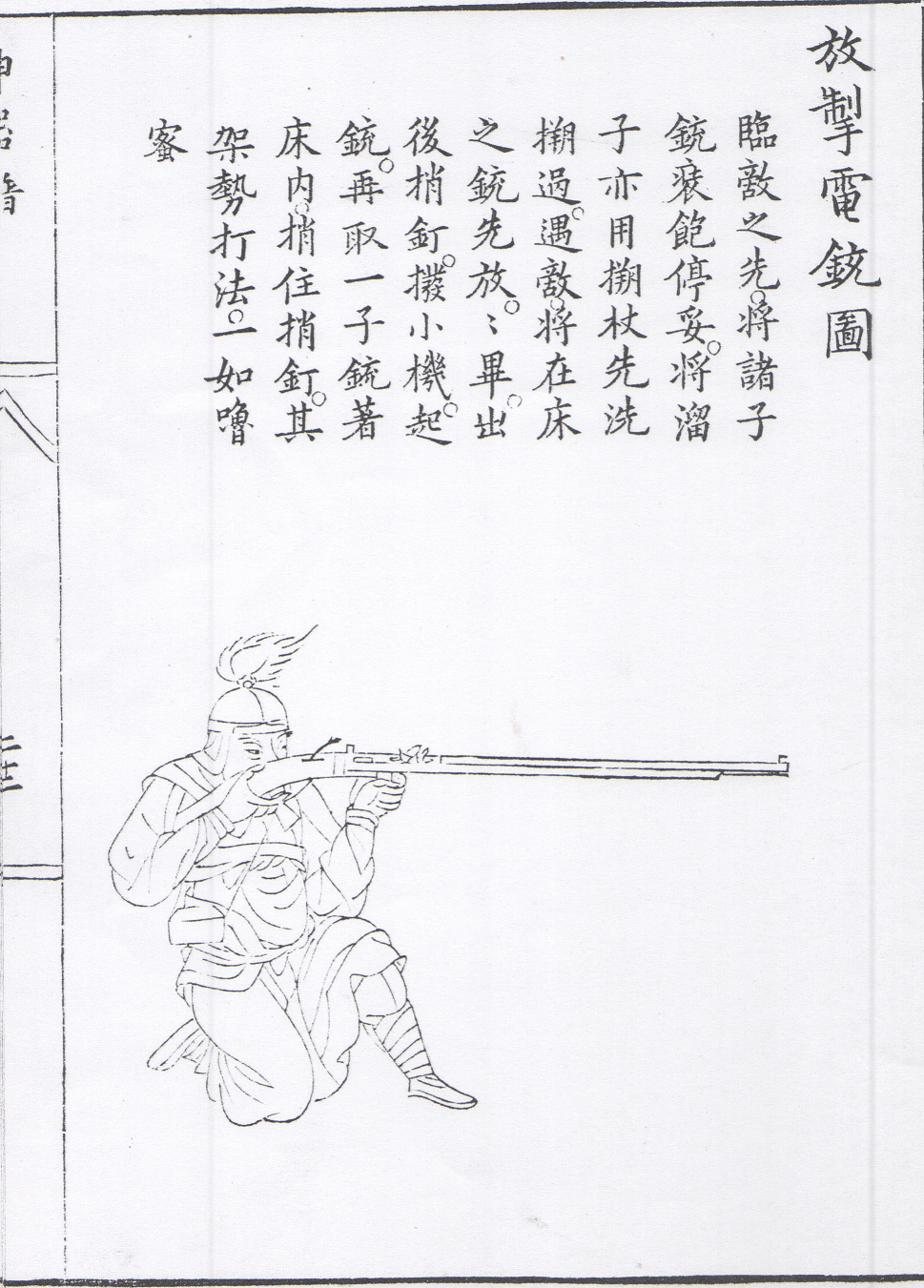
Musketeer firing a che dian chong

The che dian chong (simplified Chinese: 掣电铳; traditional Chinese: 掣電銃; lit. 'lightning quick firearm') is a breech-loading, cartridge-using musket invented by Zhao Shizhen (趙士禎) during the Ming dynasty for the dynasty's arsenals. Like all early breech loading fireams, gas leakage was a limitation and danger present in the weapon's mechanism.

The zi mu chong is also a breech loading musket, the earliest breech-loader musket known. It was indigenously developed in China in the late 16th century.
