= Hornady =

American manufacturer of ammunition and handloading components

Hornady Manufacturing Company
- Type: Private
- Industry: Ammunition
- Founded: 1949; 77 years ago
- Founder: Joyce Hornady
- Headquarters: Grand Island, Nebraska, U.S.
- Number of locations: 3
- Area served: Worldwide
- Products: Ammunition, handloading equipment and supplies.
- Owner: Steve Hornady
- Number of employees: 1000+
- Website: www.hornady.com
- Footnotes; Largest independent producer of bullets in the world

Hornady Manufacturing Company is an American manufacturer of ammunition cartridges, components and handloading equipments, based in Grand Island, Nebraska.

== History ==
Joyce W. Hornady began manufacturing bullets in the spring of 1949 with a .30 caliber 150 gr (9.7 g) spire point selling for $4.50 per hundred. Within a year Hornady was producing thirteen different bullets in five different calibers. The Korean War caused material shortages limiting early production. An early innovation was thinner copper jackets for varmint hunting bullets to cause rapid expansion and minimize size of ricochet particles. A new 8,000 ft^{2} (740 m^{2}) factory was required in 1958 to meet surging demand as returning soldiers used their firearm skills for hunting. A 200 yd (180 m) test range in an underground tunnel was built in 1960 to aid development of secant ogive bullets in 1961.

Joyce Hornady was killed in a plane crash on January 15, 1981 when piloting his privately owned Piper PA-23 light aircraft to New Orleans to attend the 1981 SHOT Show with two company colleagues Edward A. Heers, a 34-year-old engineer, and James W. Garber, a 29-year-old customer service manager. Flying in heavy fog, the twin-propeller aircraft crashed into Lake Pontchartrain while on final approach to Lakefront Airport, killing all three men on board. The company is currently run by Joyce Hornady's son, Steve Hornady, who took over after his father's death.

On June 21, 2024, Jason Hornady, currently the vice president of the firm, was arrested after being recorded driving 151 mph in a 50 mph zone south of Grand Island. A test performed at the Hall County Detention Center revealed a blood alcohol content of .151, nearly twice the legal limit. He was charged with reckless driving and speeding, resulting in a suspended license for 90 days and $700 fine.

=== Pacific Tool Company ===
Steve Hornady worked for Pacific Tool Company from 1960 to 1971, from the time the company moved from California to Nebraska until Pacific Tool was bought by Hornady. Pacific's DL-366 was their final progressive press and Hornady's first, and it is still manufactured by Hornady as the 366 Auto.

== Products ==
=== Cartridges ===
Hornady makes target shooting and hunting rounds as well as self-defense loads. In 1990, the Hornady XTP (which stands for Extreme Terminal Performance) won the industry's Product Award of Merit 1990 from the National Association of Federal Licensed Dealers. The company was the primary developer of the .17 HMR and .17 HM2 rimfire cartridges, which has become increasingly popular for small game and vermin hunting. Hornady has worked closely with firearms maker Sturm, Ruger on the development of the new line of Ruger cartridges including the .480 Ruger, .204 Ruger, and .375 Ruger.

The company developed the LEVERevolution ammunition, which uses a spitzer bullet with a soft elastomer tip to give better aerodynamic performance than flatter bullets, while eliminating the risk of a shock driving the pointed polymer tip of a bullet in a lever-action rifle's tube magazine into the primer of the cartridge in front, causing an explosion.

At the beginning of 2012, Hornady brought out a "Zombie Max" bullet, apparently due to the growing interest in "Zombie Shooting" in America.

Hornady released the Vintage Match ammunition to replicate the original military performance specifications unique to wartime rifles such as the Mauser, Lee–Enfield, Mosin–Nagant, Swedish Mauser or others chambered in 6.5×55mm, .303 British, 7.62×54mmR, 7.92×57mm Mauser and .30-06.

==== 6.5mm Creedmoor ====
In 2007, Hornady released the first 6.5mm Creedmoor Cartridge. The 6.5 Creedmoor was a joint development between former Marine Corps competitive shooter David Tubb and Hornady Ballistician David Emary. Hornady Manufactures 6.5 Creedmoor cartridges, bullets and reloading dies.

==== 6.5 PRC ====
The 6.5 PRC (Precision Rifle Cartridge) was initially designed by George Gardner of GA Precision and Hornady in 2013 and released at the 2018 SHOT Show. It is essentially a more powerful and flatter-shooting version of the 6.5mm Creedmoor and uses the same bullet, but not the same cartridge case. Rifles chambered for the 6.5mm PRC must be capable of handling (short-action length) 2.955 in (75.06 mm) overall length cartridges.

==== 300 PRC ====
The American ammunition manufacturer Hornady had the 300 Precision Rifle Cartridge SAAMI-standardized in 2018. In 2019 it was C.I.P.-standardized as the 300 PRC. The .375 Ruger cartridge has functioned as the parent case for the .300 Precision Rifle Cartridge (300 PRC), which is essentially a necked-down version of the .375 Ruger. The .375 Ruger cartridge case was used by Hornady as the basis for a new extra long range cartridge since it had the capability to operate with high chamber pressures which, combined with a neck and barrel throat optimized for loading relatively long and heavy .308 diameter very-low-drag bullets without the need to seat the bullets deeply recessed into the case result in adequate muzzle velocities from magnum sized bolt-action rifles. Rifles chambered for the 300 Precision Rifle Cartridge must be capable of handling 3.70 in (93.98 mm) overall length cartridges.

==== 7mm PRC ====
The 7mm Precision Rifle Cartridge (7mm PRC) was SAAMI-standardized in June 2022. In May 2023 it was C.I.P.-standardized as the 7 mm Precision Rifle Cartridge. The 7mm PRC cartridge case capacity is 5.05 ml (78 grains) H_{2}O. Rifles chambered for the 7mm PRC must be capable of handling (standard/long-action length) 3.34 in (84.84 mm) overall length cartridges.
