= .22 BB =

Rifle cartridge

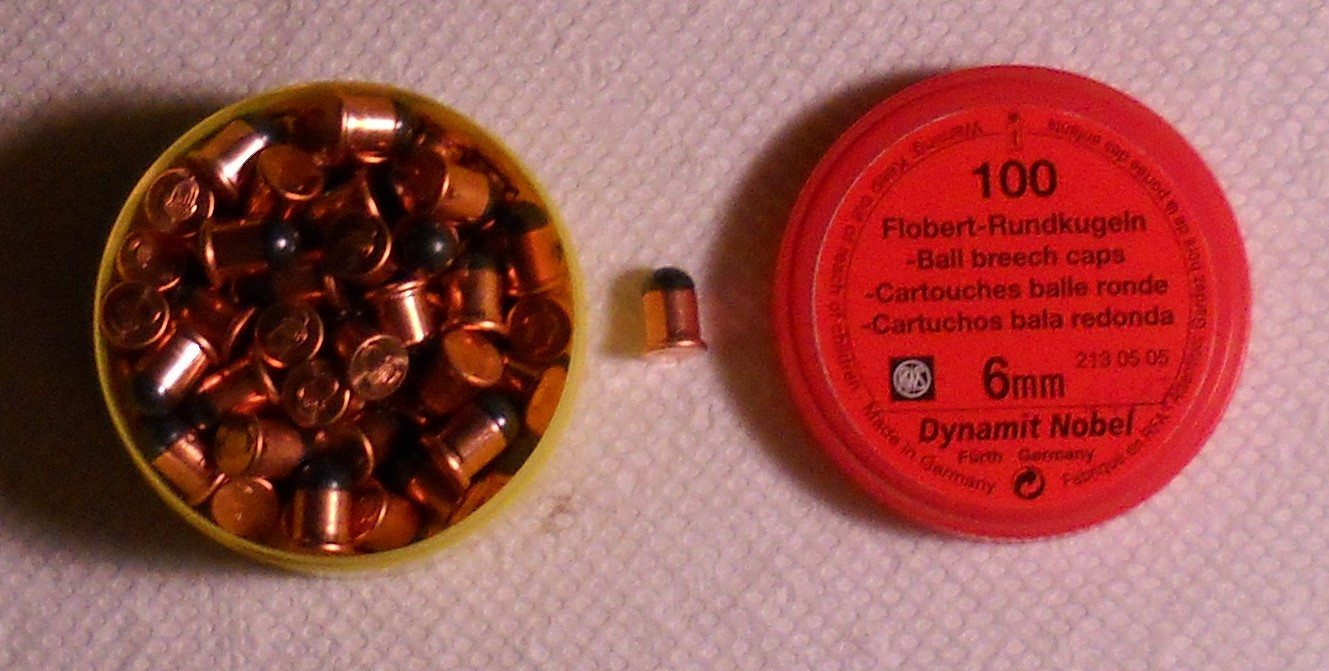
- .22 BB Cap or 6 mm Flobert with Container
- Type: Rifle
- Place of origin: France

Production history
- Designer: Louis-Nicolas Flobert
- Designed: 1845
- Produced: 1845–present

Specifications
- Parent case: Tapered percussion cap
- Case type: Rimmed, straight
- Bullet diameter: .223 in (5.7 mm)
- Neck diameter: .224 in (5.7 mm)
- Base diameter: .224 in (5.7 mm)
- Rim diameter: .270 in (6.9 mm)
- Rim thickness: .040 in (1.0 mm)
- Case length: .284 in (7.2 mm)
- Overall length: .343 in (8.7 mm)
- Primer type: Rimfire
- Maximum pressure: 5,000–8,000 psi (34.47–55.16 MPa)

Ballistic performance
Bullet mass/type	Velocity	Energy
20 gr (1 g) rn	780 ft/s (240 m/s)	26 ft⋅lbf (35 J)
18 gr (1 g) rn	780 ft/s (240 m/s)	24 ft⋅lbf (33 J)
16 gr (1 g) rn	750 ft/s (230 m/s)	20 ft⋅lbf (27 J)
- Source: Cartridges of the World

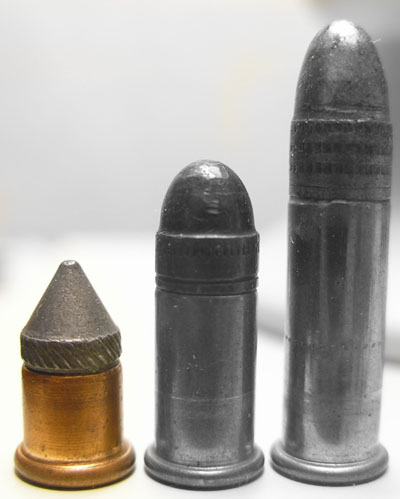
A .22 CB Cap, .22 short, and .22 Long Rifle; the BB Cap is the same length as the CB Cap, but uses a round lead ball as its projectile, instead of a conical-shaped bullet.

.22 BB Cap (Bulleted Breech Cap), also known as the 6 mm Flobert, is a variety of .22 caliber rimfire ammunition. Invented by Louis-Nicolas Flobert in 1845, it was the first rimfire metallic cartridge. The .22 BB Cap and .22 CB Cap are interchangeable and are relatively quiet, low velocity cartridges, designed for indoor target shooting with gallery guns.

== History ==
Frenchman Louis-Nicolas Flobert invented the first rimfire metallic cartridge in 1842. Known as the 4mm Randz Court or 4 mm Flobert Short. His cartridge consisted of a percussion cap with a bullet attached to the top. Flobert then made what he called "parlor guns" for this cartridge, as these rifles and pistols were designed to be shot in indoor shooting parlors in large homes. Usually derived in the 6 mm and 9 mm calibres, it is since then called the Flobert cartridge, but it does not contain any powder; the only propellant substance contained in the cartridge is within the percussion cap. In Europe, the .22 BB Cap and .22 CB Cap are both called 6mm Flobert and are considered the same cartridge.

== Description ==
These rimfires closely resemble a .22 caliber air rifle in power and are often used for indoor shooting and close range pest control. Developed for indoor shooting galleries with special "gallery guns", the .22 BB Cap was the first rimfire cartridge, dating back to 1845. It has no separate propellant charge, relying on the impulse created by the primer alone to fire a round lead ball. This results in a low muzzle velocity of around 700 ft/s (210 m/s) or less. More common is the .22 CB Cap, which fires a slightly heavier conical bullet and is available in a variety of cartridge lengths.

== Specifications ==
- Case length:
  - .22 BB Cap: 0.284 inches (7.2 mm)
  - 22 CB Cap: 0.284 inches (7.2 mm)
  - .22 Short: 0.423 inches (10.7 mm)
  - .22 Long: 0.613 inches (15.6 mm)
- Bullet weight:
  - .22 BB Cap: 18 grains (1.2 g)
  - .22 CB Cap: 18 grains (1.2 g)
  - .22 Short: 29 grains (1.9 g)
  - .22 Long: 29 grains (1.9 g)
- Muzzle velocity:
  - .22 BB Cap: 780 feet per second (240 m/s)
  - .22 CB Cap: 953 feet per second (290 m/s)
  - .22 Short: 900 feet per second (270 m/s)
  - .22 Long: 1,060 feet per second (320 m/s)

== See also ==
- .22 CB
- Munisalva
- .22 Short
- .22 Long
- .22 Extra Long
- .22 Long Rifle
- .22 Magnum
- .22 Hornet
- List of rimfire cartridges
