= .17 HMR =

Rifle cartridge

.17 Hornady Magnum Rimfire
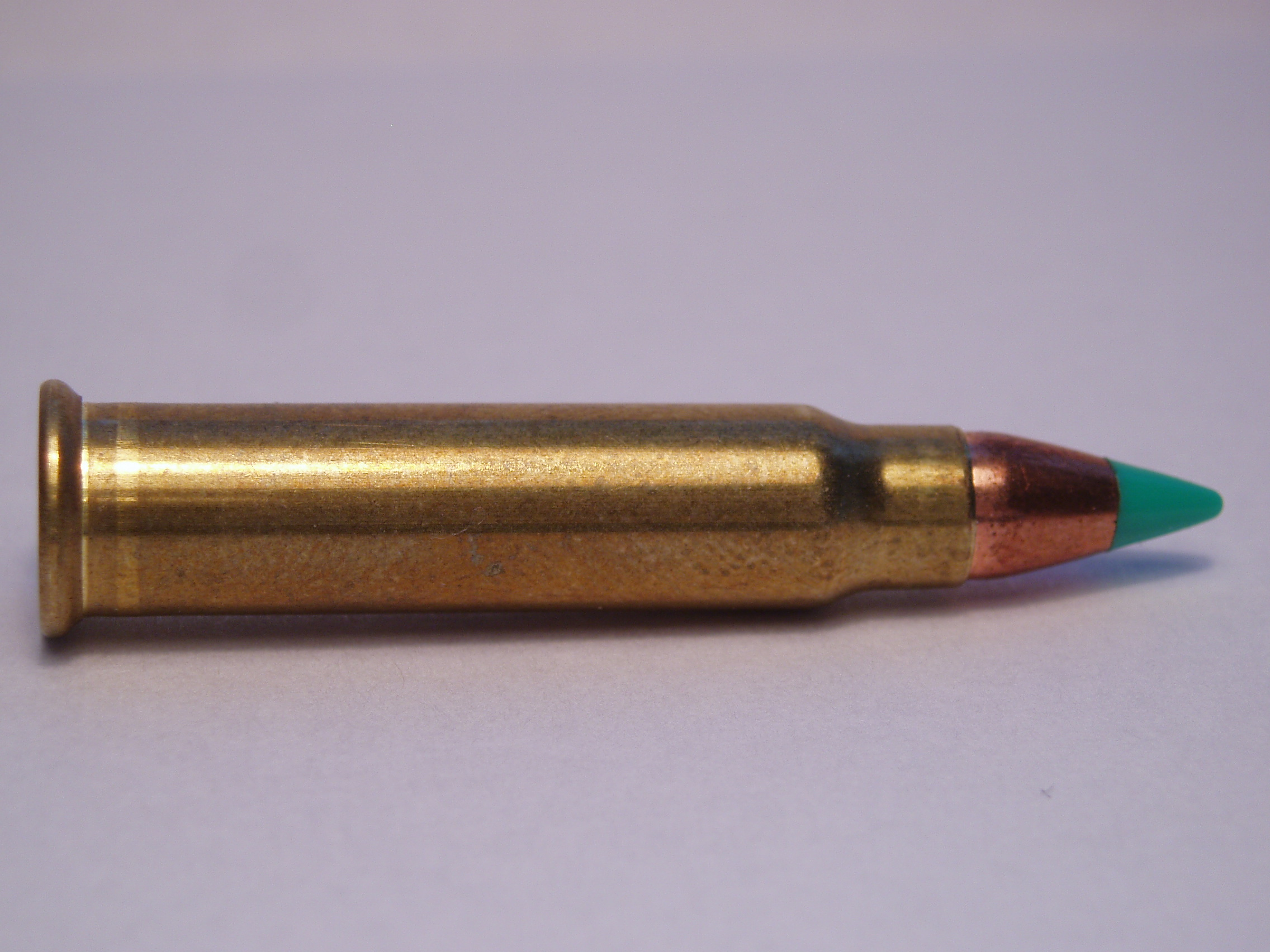
- 17-grain (1.1 g) A Sellier and Bellot .17 HMR round with a light green plastic tip.
- Type: Rifle
- Place of origin: United States

Production history
- Designer: Hornady
- Designed: 2002
- Manufacturer: CCI, Federal, Hornady, PMC, Remington, Winchester
- Produced: 2002–present

Specifications
- Parent case: .22 WMR
- Case type: Rimmed, bottleneck
- Bullet diameter: .172 in (4.4 mm)
- Land diameter: .168 in (4.3 mm)
- Neck diameter: .190 in (4.8 mm)
- Shoulder diameter: .238 in (6.0 mm)
- Base diameter: .238 in (6.0 mm)
- Rim diameter: .286 in (7.3 mm)
- Rim thickness: .05 in (1.3 mm)
- Case length: 1.058 in (26.9 mm)
- Overall length: 1.349 in (34.3 mm)
- Primer type: Rimfire
- Maximum pressure: 26,000 psi (180 MPa)

Ballistic performance
Bullet mass/type	Velocity	Energy
17 gr. (1.1 g)	2,650 ft/s (810 m/s)	265 ft⋅lbf (359 J)
20 gr. (1.3 g)	2,350 ft/s (720 m/s)	250 ft⋅lbf (340 J)

.17 Hornady Magnum Rimfire, commonly known as the .17 HMR, is a rimfire rifle cartridge developed by Hornady in 2002. It was developed by necking down a .22 Winchester Magnum Rimfire case to take a .17 caliber (4.5mm) projectile. Commonly loaded with a 17 grain (1.1 g) projectile, it can deliver muzzle velocities in excess of 775 m/s (2,650 ft/s).

== Development ==
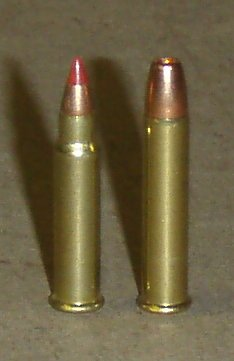
Left: .17 HMR, Right: .22 WMR

The .17 HMR round is similar to rounds developed by dedicated rimfire wildcatters who worked to create a rimfire cartridge with an exceptionally flat trajectory. These wildcatters were seeking to match the ballistics of the obsolete 5mm Remington Rimfire Magnum, which was made from 1969 to 1974, and was the fastest rimfire cartridge ever produced at the time. With 5mm (.204 in) bore barrels and diameter bullets being virtually unavailable at the time (the 5mm RFM was the last commercial 5mm (.204 in) cartridge until the release of the .204 Ruger centerfire rifle cartridge in 2004), the commercially available .17 caliber became their bullet of choice. The .22 Winchester Magnum Rimfire was the logical parent case, rather than the 5mm RFM (with its unique cartridge case dimensions, therefore requiring a different size bolt and magazine) because it was commonly available, and it is a far larger and stronger case than the next largest, the .22 Long Rifle. The .17 caliber wildcats not only met, but far exceeded the 5mm RFM with higher muzzle velocities and flatter trajectories. The accuracy of these cartridges was also quite good. However, the downrange energy of the 5mm RFM is superior to both .22 WMR and .17 HMR, so there is still some potential left in the 5mm (.204 in) rimfire for wildcatters to tinker with.

Hornady, in conjunction with Marlin Firearms and Sturm, Ruger & Co. (manufacturers in the rimfire rifle market), followed much the same path. With the .22 WMR case as the starting point, a simple barrel change was sufficient for most .22 WMR firearms to chamber the new cartridge. In 2002, the first rifles and ammunition began appearing on the market. While the ammunition was relatively expensive due to the high-performance .17 caliber bullets used, it was still cheaper than most centerfire ammunition. By 2004, CCI, Federal Cartridge and Remington had each introduced .17 HMR ammunition offerings.

== Availability ==
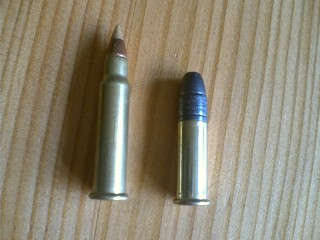
A .17 HMR cartridge with a ballistic tip (left) compared with a .22 LR cartridge (right)

Cartridges for .17 HMR come with bullets that weigh 15.5 grains (1.00 g), 17 grains (1.1 g), and 20 grains (1.3 g), and come in designs such as plastic-tipped bullets, hollow points, soft points, and FMJs. The terminal ballistics of the lightweight expanding bullets limit the .17 HMR to small game animals and varmints. .17 HMR ammunition is less common and more expensive than the .22 caliber rimfire rounds, but this is changing as the popularity of .17 HMR rifles gathers momentum.

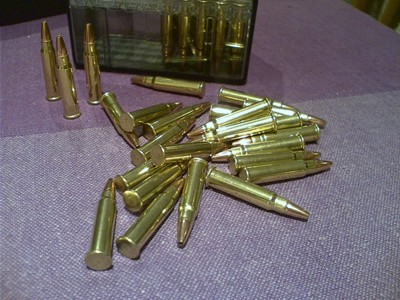
A case of .17 HMR rounds with hollow points

A growing number of companies offer .17 HMR ammunition. CCI Ammunition loads all of the .17 HMR ammunition for the CCI, Federal Cartridge, Hornady, and Remington brands. However, the ammunition is loaded with different bullets to different specifications. Ammunition is also available from Winchester, PMC and Sellier & Bellot.

Examples of bolt-action or lever-action rifles that are chambered for (or have variants chambered for) .17 HMR include Armscor M1700, Browning T-Bolt, CZ 452, Henry Golden Boy, Ruger Model 96, Sako Quad, Tikka T1X, Savage 93, Savage Revel, Steyr Zephyr II, Marlin 917 and Weihrauch 60J.

Citing safety concerns about the round's use in semi-automatic firearms, Remington issued a product safety warning and recall notice.

== .17 Hornady Mach 2 ==
Following the success of the .17 HMR, the .17 Hornady Mach 2 was introduced in early 2004. The .17 HM2 is based on the .22 LR (slightly shorter in case length) case necked down to .17 caliber and using the same bullet diameter as the .17 HMR, but at a lower velocity of approximately 2,100 feet per second (640 m/s) in the 17-grain (1.1 g) polymer tip loading.

== See also ==
- 4 mm caliber
- Table of handgun and rifle cartridges
- 4.5×26mm MKR
