= .22 CB =

Rimfire ammunition

.22 Flobert CB
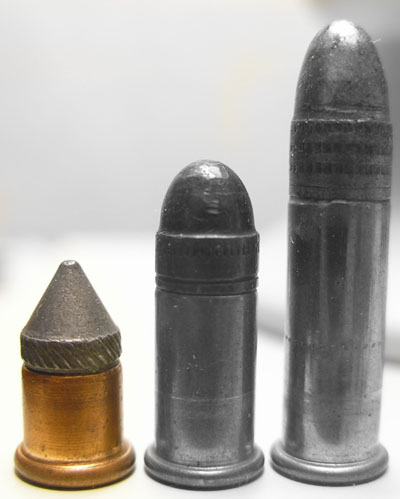
- A .22 CB Cap, .22 Short, and .22 Long Rifle
- Type: Rifle
- Place of origin: France

Production history
- Designer: Louis-Nicolas Flobert
- Designed: 1888
- Produced: 1888–present

Specifications
- Parent case: .22 BB
- Case type: Rimmed, straight
- Bullet diameter: .222 in (5.6 mm)
- Neck diameter: .225 in (5.7 mm)
- Base diameter: .225 in (5.7 mm)
- Rim diameter: .271 in (6.9 mm)
- Rim thickness: .040 in (1.0 mm)
- Case length: .284 in (7.2 mm)
- Overall length: .520 in (13.2 mm)
- Maximum pressure: 7,000–10,000 psi (48.26–68.95 MPa)

Ballistic performance
Bullet mass/type	Velocity	Energy
18 gr (1 g) Dynamit Nobel 6 mm Flobert Patronen	720 ft/s (220 m/s)	21 ft⋅lbf (28 J)
18 gr (1 g) Sellier & Bellot .22 FLOBERT CB	853 ft/s (260 m/s)	29 ft⋅lbf (39 J)
- Sources: Cartridges of the World, 11th Edition

The .22 CB Cap (Conical Bullet Cap), also known as the 6mm Flobert, is a more powerful version of the .22 BB Cap rimfire metallic cartridge, which was invented by Louis-Nicolas Flobert in 1845. The .22 BB Cap and .22 CB Cap are interchangeable and are relatively quiet, low velocity cartridges, designed for indoor target shooting.

== History ==
Designed to be a cross between the .22 BB and .22 Short, and first cataloged in 1888, it "managed to combine about all the disadvantages...[of both] into one generally useless cartridge", being no more accurate than either while being noisier than the .22 BB Cap, and penetrating much deeper, requiring a backstop as strong as for the .22 Short, thereby negating the CB Cap's advantages for shooting indoors. American ammunition manufacturers dropped the .22 CB Cap in the 1940s.

In Europe, the .22 BB Cap and .22 CB Cap are both called "6mm Flobert" and are considered the same cartridge. In Europe, the cartridge is still used in cheap rifles meant for short-range pest control. Although RWS in Germany, Eley-Kynoch in Britain, and Alcan stopped making the 6mm Flobert in the 1970s, it is still manufactured and sold in some European countries. For example, in the Czech Republic and Slovakia, Flobert guns fall within the same weapon category as air rifles, which are usually unaffected by gun laws. 6mm Flobert ammunition is also used in antique firearms chambered for the .22 Short and the .22 Long, as most modern ammunition has much higher pressure than the old black powder cartridges these guns were chambered for.

== Description ==
The .22 CB Cap has a very small propellant charge (usually no gunpowder, just the primer), resulting in a low muzzle velocities of between 350 and 853 feet per second (107 and 260 m/s). Due to their low power, classic CB rounds used in indoor target practice can be trapped by many pellet gun traps since some modern pellet guns exceed the velocity of the CB round (however, this depends on the limits designed in the individual pellet trap). In longer rifle barrels the CB has a very quiet, seemingly non-existent report due to the lack of residual pressure at the muzzle (see Internal ballistics). The CB loses velocity fast in longer barrels, due to the lack of anything other than the primer as a propellant.

=== Modern rounds ===
The original .22 CB Cap has the same tiny case as the .22 BB Cap and the two cartridges are interchangeable. There are now .22 rounds sold as .22 CB Short and .22 CB Long which come in the standard .22 Rimfire cartridge case sizes to allow the rounds to be used in standard magazine-fed firearms which would likely jam with the tiny BB or CB cases. The CCI .22 CB Short and .22 CB Long use the same 29-grain bullet as the regular .22 Short and .22 Long. The CCI CB rounds have muzzle velocities of 720 feet per second (ft/s) for an impact energy of 33 foot/pounds (ft-lb). The standard .22 Short and .22 Long fire the same bullet weight at 1,045 ft/s for 70 ft-lb. The CB rounds are relatively quiet for short range target practice, control of small pests, or use in older .22 guns that might not be safe with modern high pressure rounds. For trapping these CB Short and CB Long rounds in indoor target practice, a standard .22 bullet trap is needed. Other modern CB type rounds, such as the .22 Aguila Colibri and .22 Aguila Super Colibri, have bullets in the same weight range as the original CB Cap with velocities in the 300 ft/s to 500 ft/s range using the Long case. The CCI CB Short cartridge contains a half grain of a fine propellant.

== Specifications ==
- Case length:
  - .22 BB Cap: 0.284 inches (7.2 mm)
  - 22 CB Cap: 0.284 inches (7.2 mm)
  - .22 Short: 0.423 inches (10.7 mm)
  - .22 Long: 0.613 inches (15.6 mm)
- Bullet weight:
  - .22 BB Cap: 18 grains (1.2 g)
  - .22 CB Cap: 18 grains (1.2 g)
  - .22 Short: 29 grains (1.9 g)
  - .22 Long: 29 grains (1.9 g)
- Muzzle velocity:
  - .22 BB Cap: 780 feet per second (240 m/s)
  - .22 CB Cap: 953 feet per second (290 m/s)
  - .22 Short: 900 feet per second (270 m/s)
  - .22 Long: 1,060 feet per second (320 m/s)

== See also ==
- .22 BB
- Munisalva
- .22 Short
- .22 Long
- .22 Extra Long
- .22 Long Rifle
- .22 Magnum
- .22 Hornet
- List of rimfire cartridges

== Literature ==
- Barnes, Frank C., ed. by John T. Amber. ".22 CB Cap", in Cartridges of the World, pp. 273, 282, & 283. Northfield, IL: DBI Books, 1972. ISBN 0-695-80326-3.
