= Rimfire ammunition =

Type of ammunition that is only commonly found in small-caliber firearms

Schematic of a rimfire cartridge and its ignition

Rimfire ammunition (also rim-fire) is a type of metallic cartridge used in firearms where the primer is located within a hollow circumferential rim protruding from the base of its casing. When fired, the gun's firing pin strikes and crushes the rim against the edge of the barrel breech, sparking the primer compound within the rim and igniting the propellant within the case. Invented in 1845 by Louis-Nicolas Flobert, the first rimfire metallic cartridge was the .22 BB Cap (also known as the 6 mm Flobert) cartridge, which consisted of a percussion cap with a bullet attached to the top. While many other different cartridge priming methods have been tried since the early 19th century, such as teat-fire and pinfire, only small caliber rimfire (.22 caliber (5.6 mm) or less) cartridges have survived to the present day with regular use. The .22 Long Rifle rimfire cartridge, introduced in 1887, is by far the most common ammunition found in the world today in terms of units manufactured and sold.

== Characteristics ==
Comparison of centerfire and rimfire ignition

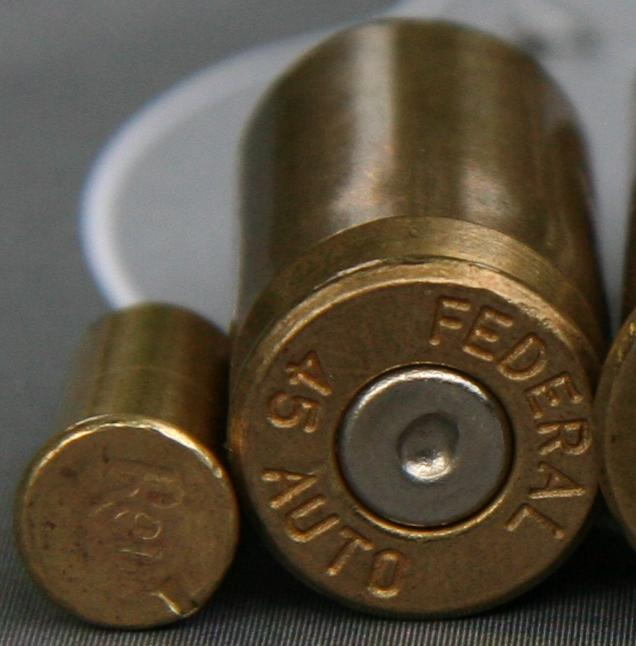
Fired rimfire (left) and centerfire cartridges. A rimfire firing pin produces a notch at the edge of the case; a centerfire pin produces a depression in the center of the primer.

It is named rimfire ammunition as the firing pin strikes and crushes the base's rim to ignite the primer. The rim of such a cartridge is essentially an expanded and flattened end section of the case, and the priming compound is filled from inside into the trough cavity inside the rim. The case is then filled with propellant (gunpowder) and sealed off by the projectile (bullet).

Rimfire cartridges are limited to low chamber pressures because the case must be thin enough to allow the firing pin to crush the rim and ignite the primer. Rimfire cartridges of up to .58 caliber were once common when black powder was used as a propellant. Modern rimfire cartridges use smokeless powder, which generates much higher pressures and tend to be of .22 caliber (5.6 mm) or smaller in diameter. This also means that rimfire firearms can be very light and inexpensive, as the production cost of the case material and powder load are both low, and the manufacturing process is significantly more streamlined than that for centerfire cartridges (which require more steps in the assembly process). As a result, rimfire cartridges are typically very affordable, primarily because of the inherent cost-efficiency of manufacturing in large lots, which has contributed to the continuing market popularity of these small-caliber cartridges.

== History ==
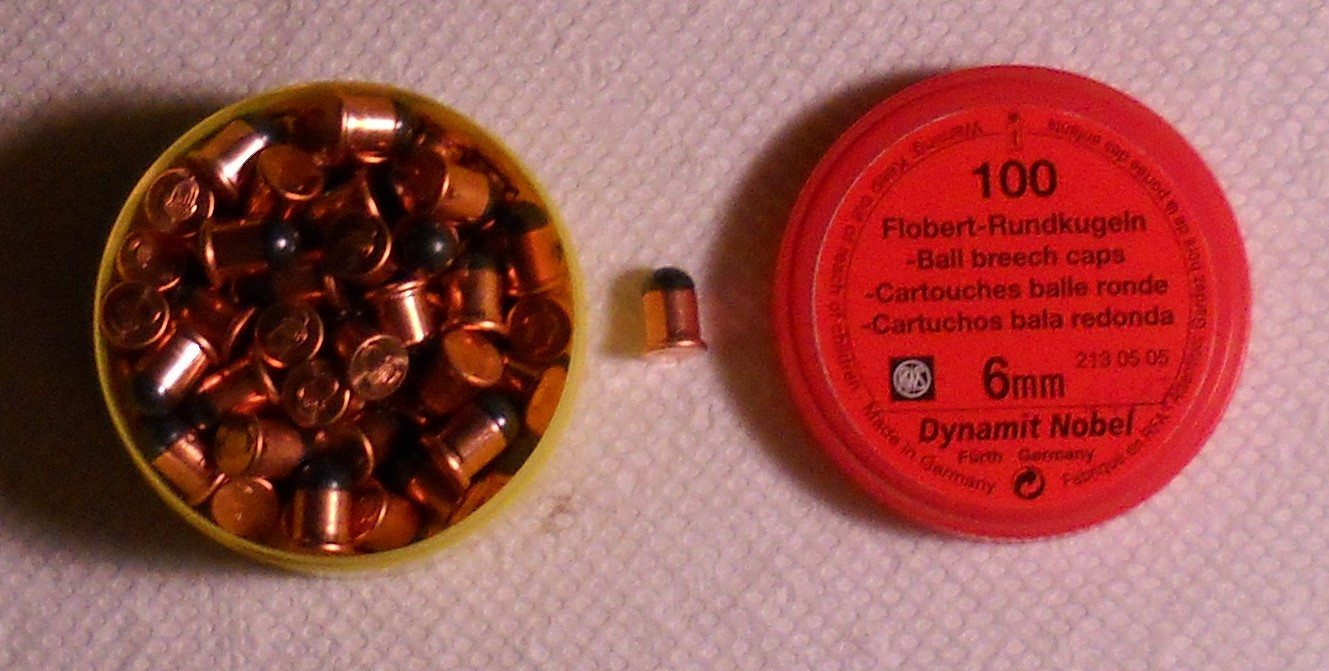
6 mm Flobert or .22 BB Cap ammo with Container

Frenchman Louis-Nicolas Flobert invented the first rimfire metallic cartridge in 1845. The 6mm Flobert cartridge consisted of a percussion cap with a bullet attached to the top. These cartridges do not contain any powder, the only propellant substance contained in the cartridge is the percussion cap. In Europe, the .22 BB Cap (introduced in 1845) and the slightly more powerful .22 CB Cap (introduced in 1888) are both called 6mm Flobert and are considered the same cartridge. These cartridges have a relatively low muzzle velocity of around 600 ft/s (183 m/s) to 800 ft/s (244 m/s).

Flobert also made what he called "parlor guns" for this cartridge, as these rifles and pistols were designed for target shooting in homes with a dedicated shooting parlor or shooting gallery. 6mm Flobert Parlor pistols came into fashion in the mid-19th century; they typically featured heavy barrels. This cartridge was improved upon by Benjamin Houllier in 1846.

The next rimfire cartridge was the .22 Short, developed for Smith & Wesson's first revolver, in 1857; it used a longer rimfire case and 4 gr (0.26 g) of black powder to fire a conical bullet. According to Berkeley R. Lewis, a firearms historian, this later Smith & Wesson cartridge was 'essentially the same as Houllier's 1846 patent'. This led to the .22 Long in 1871, with the same bullet weight as the short but with a longer case and 5 gr (0.32 g) of black powder. This was followed by the .22 Extra Long in 1880, with a longer case and heavier bullet than the .22 Long.

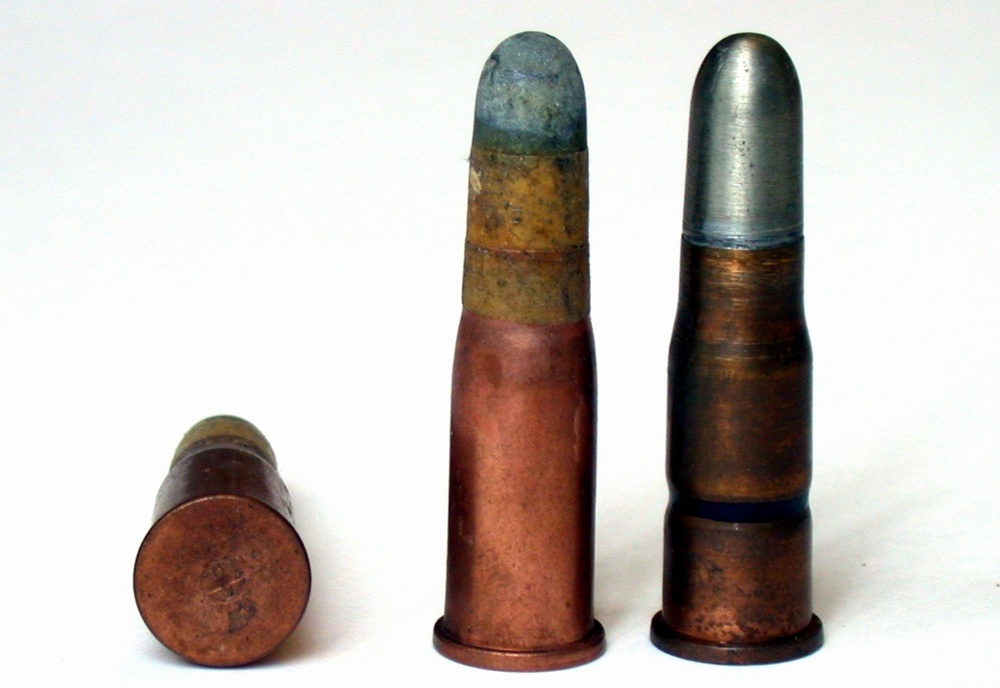
.41 Swiss rimfire cartridge

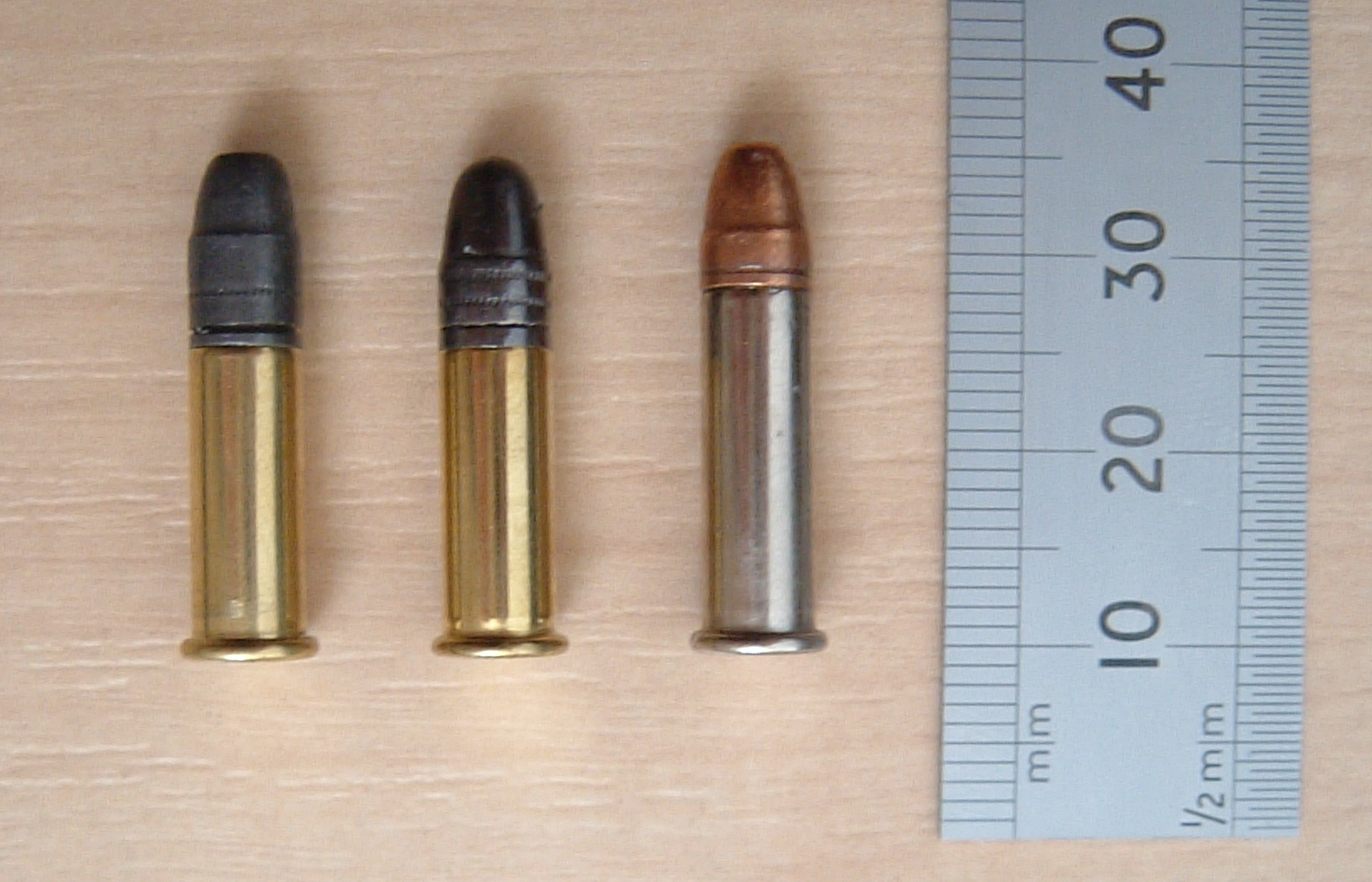
.22 Long Rifle – subsonic hollow point (left), standard velocity (center), hyper-velocity "Stinger" hollow point (right)

American firearms manufacturer J. Stevens Arms & Tool Company introduced the .22 Long Rifle cartridge in 1887. It combined the casing of the .22 Long with the 40-grain (2.6 g) bullet of the .22 Extra Long, giving it a longer overall length, a higher muzzle velocity, and superior performance as a hunting and target round, rendering the .22 BB Cap, .22 CB Cap, .22 Short, .22 Long, and .22 Extra Long cartridges obsolete. The .22 LR uses a heeled bullet, which means that the bullet is the same diameter as the case, which has a narrower "heel" portion that fits into the case. It is one of the few cartridges that are manufactured and used in a large variety of rifles and handguns.

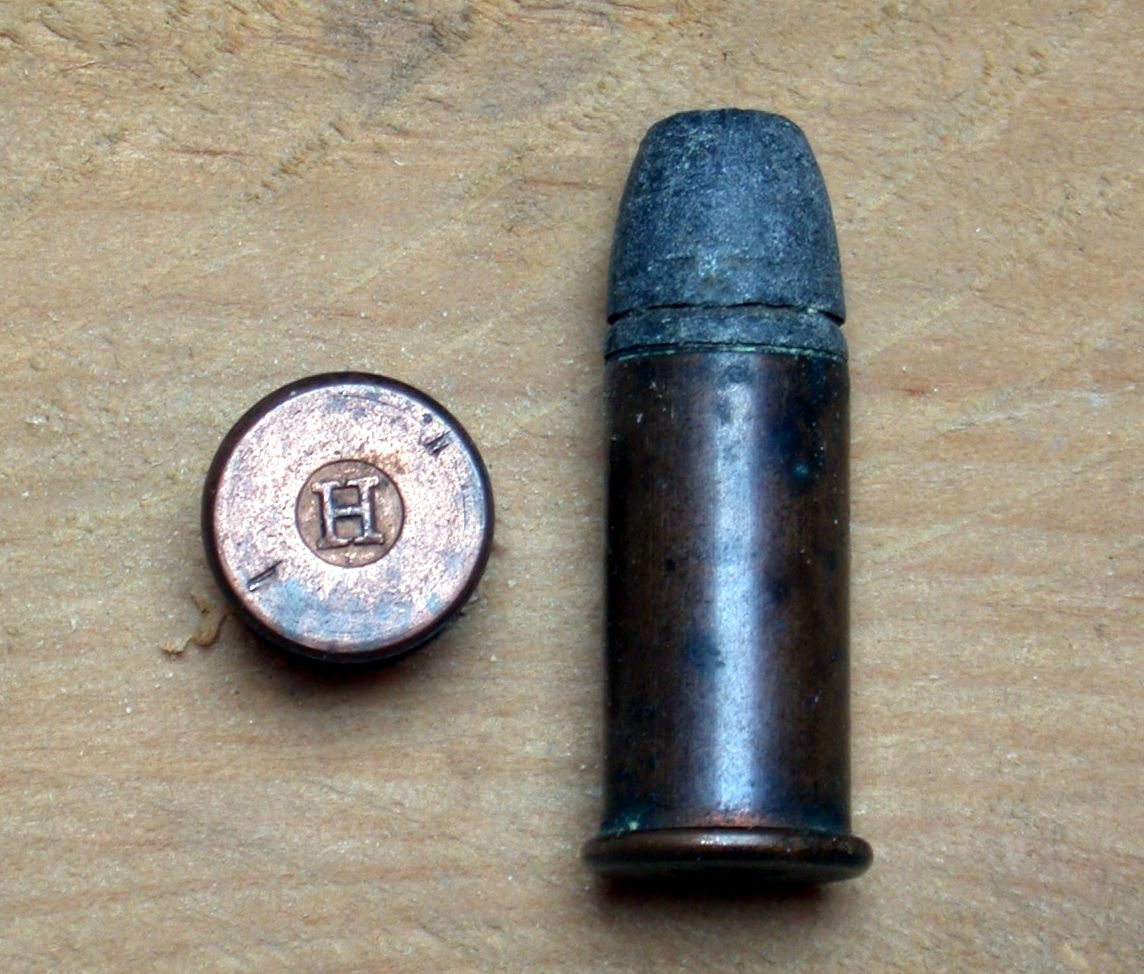
.44 Henry rimfire cartridge

Larger rimfire calibers were used during the American Civil War in the Henry repeating rifle, the Spencer repeating rifle, the Ballard Rifle, and the Frank Wesson carbine. While rimfire cartridges larger than .22 caliber existed, such as the .30 rimfire, .32 rimfire, .38 rimfire, .41 Short (for the Remington Model 95 derringer), .44 Henry (for the Henry rifle, later used by the famous Winchester Model 1866), the .56-56 Spencer (for the Spencer rifle was the world's first military metallic cartridge repeating rifle), all the way up to the .58 Miller, they were quickly made obsolete by the newly developed centerfire cartridges.

The early 21st century has seen a revival in .17 caliber (4.5 mm) rimfire cartridges. New and increasingly popular, the 17 HMR (.17 Hornady Magnum Rimfire) is based on a .22 WMR casing with a smaller formed neck which accepts a .17 bullet. The advantages of the 17 HMR over .22 WMR and other rimfire cartridges are its much flatter trajectory and its highly frangible hollow point bullets (often manufactured with plastic "ballistic tips" that improve the bullet's external ballistics). The .17 HM2 (.17 Hornady Mach 2) is based on the .22 Long Rifle and offers similar performance advantages over its parent cartridge, at a significantly higher cost. While .17 HM2 sells for about four times the cost of .22 Long Rifle ammunition, it is still significantly cheaper than most centerfire ammunition and somewhat cheaper than the .17 HMR. First shown at the 2013 SHOT Show, the .17 WSM (.17 Winchester Super Magnum) uses the blank case from a .27 caliber nail gun that is necked down to accommodate a .17 caliber bullet, resulting in a much higher muzzle velocity and energy than the .17 HMR.

== Shot shells ==
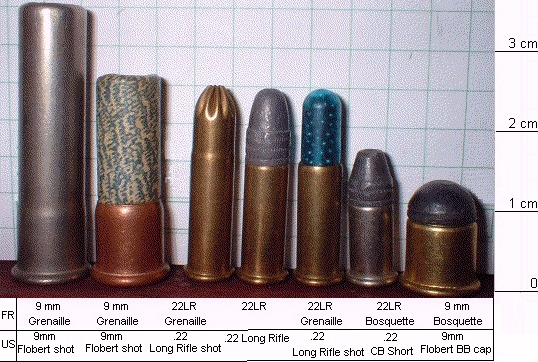
9 mm Flobert shot, 9 mm Flobert shot, .22 Long Rifle shot, .22 Long Rifle, .22 Long Rifle shot, .22 CB Short, and 9 mm Flobert BB cap

Some .22 caliber rimfire cartridges are loaded with a small amount of No. 11 or No. 12 shot (about .067 oz (1.9 g)). This "snake shot" is only marginally effective in close ranges, and is usually used for shooting snakes, rats or other small animals. It is also useful for shooting birds inside storage buildings as it will not penetrate walls or ceilings. At a distance of about 10 ft (3.0 m), which is about the maximum effective range, the pattern is about 8 in (200 mm) in diameter from a standard rifle. Special smoothbore shotguns, such as the Marlin Model 25MG garden gun, can produce effective patterns out to 15 to 20 yd (14 to 18 m) using .22 WMR shotshells, which hold .125 oz (3.5 g) of No. 11 or No. 12 shot contained in a plastic capsule.

Shotshells will usually not feed reliably in some magazine-fed firearms, because of the unusual shape of some cartridges that are crimped closed at the case mouth, and the relatively fragile plastic tips of other designs. Shotshells will not produce sufficient power to cycle semiautomatic actions, because, unlike projectile ammunition, nothing forms to the lands and grooves of the barrel to create the pressure necessary to cycle the firearm's action.

The 9 mm Flobert is a notable rimfire cartridge that is still in production in Europe and is chambered by the Winchester Model 36 in the 1920s. This cartridge is primarily loaded with a small amount of shot, but can also fire a small ball, and is used in garden guns, which are miniature shotguns. Its power and range are very limited, making it suitable only for pest control. An example of a rare but modern 9 mm Flobert Rimfire among hunters in Europe is the 1 3/4 in (44 mm) brass shotshell manufactured by Fiocchi in Lecco, Italy, using a .25 oz (7.1 g) shot of No. 8 shot with a velocity of 600 ft/s (180 m/s).

== List of current production rimfire ammunition ==
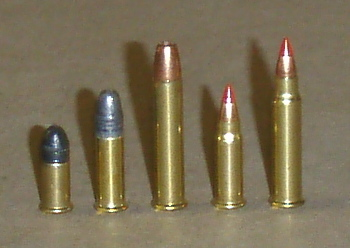
Rimfire ammunition, from left to right, .22 Short, .22 Long Rifle, .22 WMR, .17 HM2, and .17 HMR

- .17 Hornady Magnum Rimfire (.17 HMR): a .17 caliber cartridge based on a modified .22 WMR case.
- .17 Hornady Mach 2 (.17 HM2): a .17 caliber cartridge based on a modified .22 Long Rifle Stinger case, uncommon but available.
- .17 Winchester Super Magnum (.17 WSM): a .17 caliber cartridge based on a modified .27 caliber nail gun blank cartridge, uncommon but available.
- 5mm Remington Rimfire Magnum (5 mm RFM): a .20 caliber rimfire cartridge that is based on the .22 Winchester Magnum Rimfire case, it has greater muzzle energy, longer range, and a flatter trajectory over many of the other rimfire cartridges, uncommon but available.
- .21 Sharp: a new .21 caliber cartridge based on a modified .22 LR case, uncommon but available.
- .22 BB Cap: also known as 6mm Flobert in Europe, uncommon but available.
- .22 CB Cap: a slightly longer version of the .22 BB Cap rimfire cartridge, uncommon but available.
- .22 Short: an early rimfire cartridge that found worldwide commercial success. It was commonly used for target shooting, including Olympic and ISSF 25 m Rapid Fire Pistol competition shooting, until being replaced by .22 Long Rifle in 2005, uncommon but available.
- .22 Long: a longer and slightly more power rimfire cartridge that is based on the .22 Short, uncommon but available.
- .22 Long Rifle (.22 LR): The most common rimfire cartridge worldwide. It is chambered in numerous firearms including rifles, pistols, revolvers, and submachine guns and for various uses including plinking, hunting, shooting sports, and self-defence.
- .22 Winchester Magnum Rimfire (.22 WMR): also known as the .22 Magnum, this is a longer rimfire cartridge based on the .22 Winchester Rimfire cartridge with an increase in both muzzle energy and velocity.
- .22 Winchester Rimfire (.22 WRF): also known as the .22 Remington Special, it has slightly more muzzle energy than the more common .22 Long Rifle rimfire cartridge, uncommon but available.
- .22 Winchester Automatic: also known as the .22 Win Auto, it was only chambered for the Winchester Model 1903 semi-automatic rifle, uncommon but available.
- 9mm Flobert: a garden gun cartridge that is still used in Europe, uncommon but available.

== See also ==
- Cartridge (firearms)
- List of rimfire cartridges
