= Winchester Model 1906 =

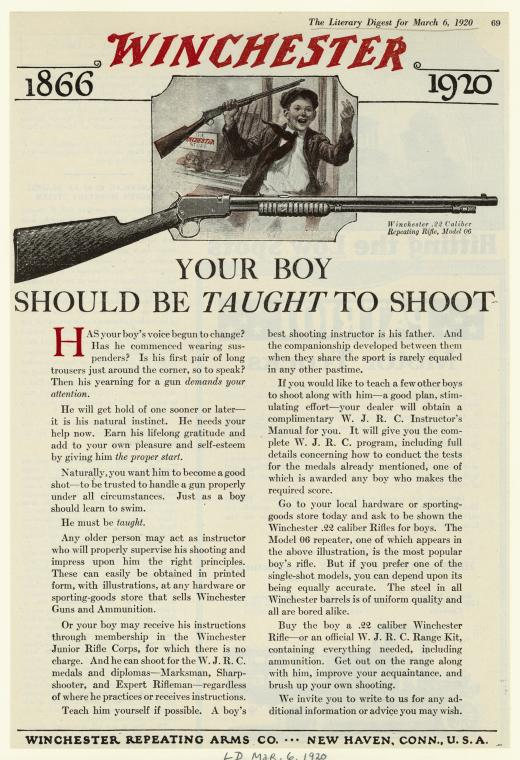
- Advertisement for Winchester 1906
- Type: Slide-Action Rimfire rifle
- Place of origin: United States

Production history
- Designer: John Browning and Matthew Browning
- Manufacturer: Winchester Repeating Arms Company
- Produced: 1906-1932
- No. built: 731,862
- Variants: Winchester Model 1890, Winchester Model 62

Specifications
- Caliber: .22 Short, .22 Long, .22 Long Rifle
- Action: Slide-Action
- Feed system: Tubular magazine. Capacities: 22 Short, 15 cartridges; 22 Long, 12 cartridges; 22 Long Rifle 11 cartridges.

The Winchester Model 1906 was a .22 caliber slide-action takedown rifle manufactured by the Winchester Repeating Arms Company from 1906-1932 with a total production of 729,305 built.

== History ==
The Winchester Model 1906 was designed as a more inexpensive companion to the popular Model 1890, the main differences being the 1906's flat shotgun-style butt plate and rounded barrel, as opposed to the 1890s crescent butt plate and octagon barrel. When the Model 1906 first became available, it was chambered exclusively for the .22 Short cartridge, however, this was modified after serial number 113,000 (in the second year of production, 1908) when it was made to also cycle .22 Long and .22 Long Rifle interchangeably in order to ensure the rifle's continued popularity. There were three different variants produced by Winchester; the .22 Short Model, the Standard Model, and the Expert Model. The .22 Short Model was made until 1908 when the caliber modification came about. It was distinguishable by its flat, plain slide grip. The Standard Model was introduced after the 1908 change, and featured a grooved slide grip, while the Expert Model, the deluxe version produced from 1918 to 1924, had a plain fluted slide grip and a pistol-gripped stock. The Expert Model was a favorite of Theodore Roosevelt's children and cousins. Although production ended officially in 1932, a small number of Model 1906 rifles were built out of spare parts left in the factory until 1936. The last known serial number is 847,997, which does not match the number of rifles sold. This is attributed to the fact that large blocks of serial numbers were skipped during production.

== See also ==
- Winchester rifle
- Pump-action
