= Remington .22 Junior Special =

- Type: Bolt-action Rifle
- Place of origin: USA

Service history
- In service: 1947–1969

Production history
- Designer: Remington Arms
- Designed: 1930s
- Produced: 1930s-1969
- No. built: Approximately 66,338

Specifications (.22 Special Junior)
- Mass: 5½ lbs
- Length: 35¼ inch
- Barrel length: 16½ inch
- Caliber: .22
- Action: Manually operated bolt action
- Maximum firing range: 270 m
- Feed system: 5 round detachable box

Remington .22 Junior Special Long and Short is a Bolt-action rifle launched in the 1930s by Remington Arms.

It is fitted with a peep sight set which is much more accurate than regular iron sights. The rifle is lightweight and sturdy. It comes with a 5-round detachable loading magazine that inserts from underneath the firing chamber. The only problem with this rifle is that the magazine was built cheaply and sometimes splits in half, however this does not affect the rifle in any way except in the speed of reloading.

The rifle uses three types of ammunition: .22 Long, .22 Short, and .22 Long Rifle.
