= Winchester Model 62 =

- Type: Slide-Action Rimfire rifle
- Place of origin: United States

Production history
- Designer: John Browning
- Manufacturer: Winchester Repeating Arms Company
- Produced: 1932-1958
- No. built: 410,000

Specifications
- Caliber: .22 Short, .22 Long, .22 Long Rifle, .22 Winchester Rimfire
- Action: Slide-Action
- Feed system: 22 Round Tube Magazine

The Winchester Model 62 is a slide-action repeating rifle produced by the Winchester Repeating Arms Company in the early 20th century.

The gun replaced the Model 1906. It was a take-down rifle that was able to accept most .22 caliber rimfire cartridges, specifically .22 Short, .22 Long, and .22 Long Rifle.

Around serial number 98000 (1940) minor changes in the mechanism lead to the model designation 62A. They remained in production until 1958.

== Rossi Model 62 ==
From 1970 and 1998, Amadeo Rossi manufactured the Rossi Model 62, which was essentially a Winchester Model 62 with a 12-round tubular magazine.
