= Winchester Model 1890 =

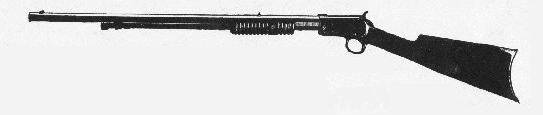
- Winchester Model 1890
- Type: Slide-Action Rimfire rifle
- Place of origin: United States

Production history
- Designer: John Browning
- Manufacturer: Winchester Repeating Arms Company
- Produced: 1890-1941
- No. built: 849,000 (approx.)

Specifications
- Caliber: .22 Short, .22 Long, .22 Long Rifle, .22 Winchester Rimfire
- Action: Slide-Action
- Feed system: 22 Round Tube Magazine

The Winchester Model 1890 is a pump action repeating rifle produced by the Winchester Repeating Arms Company in the late 19th and early 20th century.

== History ==
In the late 1880s, the Winchester Repeating Arms Company asked John Browning to design a replacement for the Model 1873 rifle since the rimfire version of the Model 1873 had never achieved any great popularity. On June 26, 1888, a patent for the new design was issued to John and Matthew Browning. Under this patent, Winchester created the second repeating slide action .22 rifle ever successfully developed and manufactured, being narrowly edged out by the small-frame Colt Lightning Carbine.

The Model 1890 proved to be the most successful repeating rimfire rifle for general all-around shooting ever made by Winchester. Approximately 849,000 Model 1890 rifles were produced between 1890 and 1932, after which the Model 1890 was replaced by the Winchester Model 62 rifle. The final cleanup of stock on hand was completed in 1941.

For many years, the Model 1890 was considered to be the standard for use in shooting galleries, hence its nickname of "gallery gun."

== Design and Features ==
The Model 1890 was a slide-action, top-ejecting rifle with an 18-inch magazine tube under the barrel. It had a 24-inch octagonal barrel, a plain walnut stock, and an overall weight of approximately 6lbs.

Calibers for the rifle include .22 Short, .22 Long, .22 Long Rifle, and .22 Winchester Rimfire. The Model 1890 will only feed the round specific to that gun (e.g. a Model 1890 stamped ".22 Short" on the barrel will not feed .22 Long, .22 Long Rifle, or .22 WRF; despite there being other 1890s chambered in those calibers). The .22 Long Rifle version was added in 1919.

Pistol grip stocks were available on later rifles.

== Variants ==
The Model 1890 was produced in three distinct versions.

The first model had a solid frame, a case-hardened receiver, and a fixed rear sight. Approximately 15,000 of these were produced between 1890 and 1892.

The second model was designed as a takedown rifle. It also had a case-hardened receiver but had an adjustable rear sight. In August 1901, the case-hardened receiver was changed to a blued version. Approximately 100,000 second-model rifles were produced with case-hardened receivers, and 200,000 were produced with blued receivers. A deluxe version was offered, which featured a fancy checkered walnut stock available in either straight or pistol grip and a grooved slide handle.

The third model was also produced as a takedown rifle and featured a modified receiver that allowed the breech bolt to lock externally. The third model was also available in a deluxe version, which, similar to the second model, featured a fancy checkered walnut stock available in either straight or pistol grip and a grooved slide handle.

== See also ==
- Winchester rifle
- Pump-action
