= .22 Winchester Rimfire =

Rimfire rifle cartridge

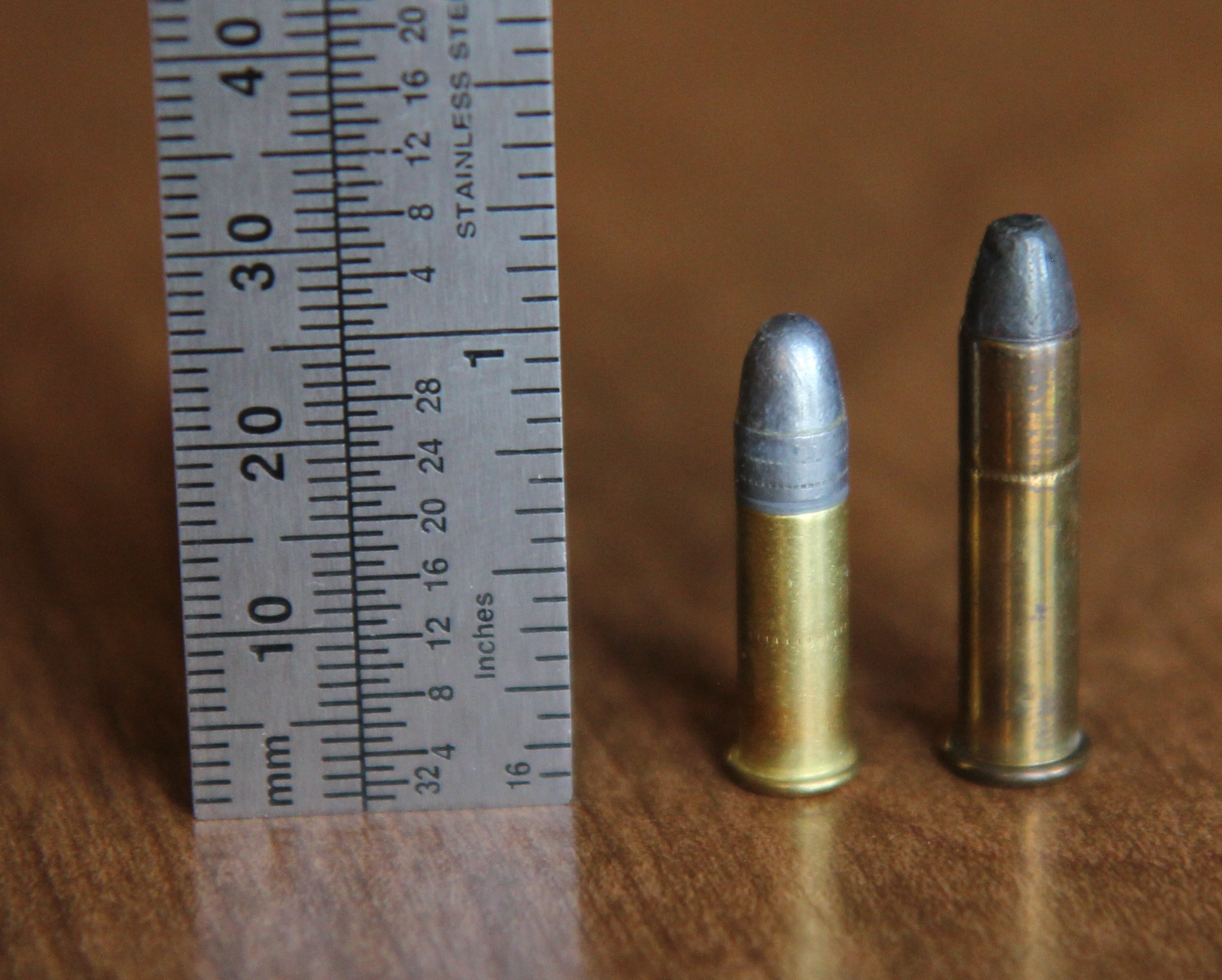
- .22 Long Rifle (left) and .22 Winchester Rimfire (right).
- Type: Rifle
- Place of origin: United States

Production history
- Designed: 1890
- Produced: 1890–present

Specifications
- Case type: Rimmed, straight
- Bullet diameter: .2285 in (5.80 mm)
- Neck diameter: .2435 in (6.18 mm)
- Base diameter: .2455 in (6.24 mm)
- Rim diameter: .300 in (7.6 mm)
- Rim thickness: .050 in (1.3 mm)
- Case length: .965 in (24.5 mm)
- Overall length: 1.180 in (30.0 mm)
- Rifling twist: 1:14 in (360 mm)
- Primer type: Rimfire
- Maximum pressure: 19,000 psi (130 MPa)

Ballistic performance
Bullet mass/type	Velocity	Energy
45 gr (2.9 g) standard velocity	1,050 ft/s (320 m/s)	105 ft⋅lbf (142 J)
45 gr (2.9 g) solid lead	1,450 ft/s (440 m/s)	210 ft⋅lbf (280 J)
40 gr (2.6 g) hollowpoint (high velocity)	1,440 ft/s (440 m/s)	185 ft⋅lbf (251 J)
- Sources: Barnes & Amber 1972

The .22 Winchester Rimfire (commonly called the .22 WRF or .22 Remington Special) is an American rimfire rifle cartridge.

== History ==
Introduced in the Winchester M1890 slide rifle, it had a flat-nose slug, and is identical to the .22 Remington Special (which differs only in having a round nosed bullet). It uses a flat-based, inside-lubricated bullet, which differs from the outside-lube heeled bullet of the .22 BB, .22 CB, .22 Short, .22 Long, .22 Long Rifle, and .22 Extra Long cartridges.

When introduced, the .22 WRF "was the first notable improvement in the killing power" over the .22 LR, and was very capable of taking small game at up to 75 yd (69 m). It is somewhat less accurate than the .22 LR and is most suited to hunting small game such as rabbits or prairie dogs.

Shortly before World War II, propellants were developed that greatly increased the effectiveness of the .22 LR. These new "high velocity" loadings offered a nearly 300 ft/s (91 m/s) increase in velocity over the original 1,050 ft/s (320 m/s) .22 LR load. This increase in power of the smaller round, coupled with its cheaper price and sheer number of rifles already owned in .22 LR, effectively diminished the popularity of the .22 WRF.

A variety of Winchester, Remington, and Stevens single-shot and repeating rifles were offered from 1890 onward, but new rifles are not made for this cartridge. The .22 WRF ammunition is periodically offered by commercial manufacturers for use in the old firearms. It can be fired in any rifle chambered for the more powerful and longer .22 WMR. The shorter .22 WRF cartridge may be limited to .22 WMR revolvers or single-shot usage in .22 WMR rifles, since it may not feed correctly from the longer .22 WMR-length magazines, depending on its design.

== Dimensions ==
Cartridge dimensions as specified by ANSI/SAAMI.

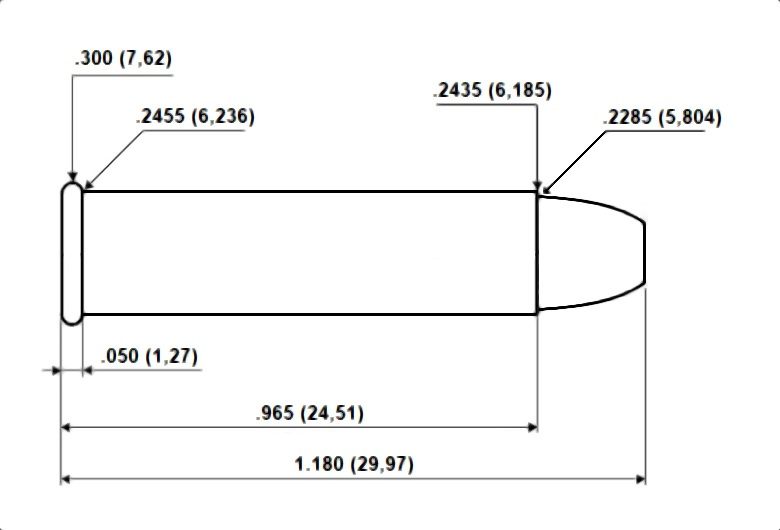

== See also ==
- List of cartridges by caliber
- List of rifle cartridges
- List of rimfire cartridges
- 5 mm caliber

== Notes ==
- Barnes, Frank C., ed. by John T. Amber. ".22 Winchester Rimfire", in Cartridges of the World, pp. 275 & 282-3. Northfield, IL: DBI Books, 1972. ISBN 0-695-80326-3.
