= .25 short =

Obsolete .25 caliber pistol cartridge

.25 Short
- Type: Revolver
- Place of origin: United States

Production history
- Produced: 1860–1920

Specifications
- Case type: Rimmed, straight
- Bullet diameter: .245–.246 in (6.2–6.2 mm)
- Neck diameter: .245 in (6.2 mm)
- Shoulder diameter: .245 in (6.2 mm)
- Base diameter: .245 in (6.2 mm)
- Rim diameter: .290 in (7.4 mm)
- Case length: .468 in (11.9 mm)
- Overall length: .780 in (19.8 mm)
- Primer type: Rimfire
- Maximum pressure: 10,000–12,000 psi (68.95–82.74 MPa)

Ballistic performance
Bullet mass/type	Velocity	Energy
43 gr (3 g)	750 ft/s (230 m/s)	53 ft⋅lbf (72 J)
- Sources: Barnes & Amber 1972

The .25 Short, also known as the .25 Bacon & Bliss, is a .25 in (6.35 mm) American rimfire handgun cartridge.

Introduced for the F. D. Bliss revolver in 1860, it was also available in a number of other inexpensive weapons of the period. It was never offered as a rifle caliber.

With a 43 gr (2.8 g; 0.098 oz) outside lubricated bullet over 5 gr (0.32 g; 0.011 oz) of black powder, it is similar in appearance to the .22 Short. Its power is comparable to the black powder loadings of the .22 Long Rifle. It was available from both Remington and Winchester.

The round continued to be commercially available until 1920, but is now considered a collectible.

== See also ==
- List of cartridges by caliber
- List of handgun cartridges
- List of rimfire cartridges
- 6 mm caliber

== Notes ==
- Barnes, Frank C., ed. by John T. Amber. ".25 Short", in Cartridges of the World, pp. 276, 282, & 283. Northfield, IL: DBI Books, 1972. ISBN 0-695-80326-3.
