= Heeled bullet =

Bullet fitting in a narrow cartridge case

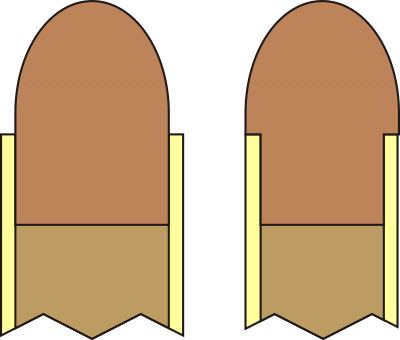
Heeled bullet with necked base (right), conventional design (left)

A heeled bullet is a bullet that is necked down at its base to allow a projectile the full internal diameter of a gun barrel to fit in a cartridge case of the same or narrower dimension. Heeled bullets mostly disappeared with the advent of smokeless powder cartridges, though older rimfire designs, such as the .22 caliber cartridges, still use heeled bullets, and many cartridges that date back to the black powder era still reflect their heeled bullet origins in their caliber designations.

More powerful smokeless powder allowed the use of smaller, non-heeled projectiles in existing caliber guns. Two examples are a ".38 caliber" firearm actually shooting bullets of .357 in (9.1 mm) diameter, and a ".44 caliber" bullets of .429 in (10.9 mm) diameter. This legacy of historic heeled bullets is the cause of confusion among many shooting enthusiasts over the actual physical diameters of the bullets they fire.

== Reasons for change ==
The heeled bullet design has many advantages, mainly when coupled with the straight or slightly tapered walled cases it appeared in. For pistols, converting a cap and ball revolver to use cartridges was as simple as cutting off part of the rear of the cylinder, replacing it with a frame-mounted ring, and changing the hammer. It also made new revolvers easier and cheaper to manufacture, as the chambers could simply be drilled straight through the cylinder, whereas bullets narrower than the case required two different diameters to be drilled, and careful control of the depth for the larger diameter bit. Finally, it made it very easy to chamber cartridges of the same diameter but differing lengths in the same firearm, which is still commonly seen today in .22 caliber rimfire firearms, which are marked ".22 Short, .22 Long, and .22 Long Rifle". While this can be done with straight-walled cases not using heeled bullets, such as .38 Special in .357 Magnum firearms, it tends to create lead and powder residue buildup at the front of the chamber, which can cause reliability problems if not cleaned out before switching back to the longer case.

One of the primary reasons for the change was the issue of lubrication. Lead bullets, especially soft, low-alloy lead used in low-pressure cartridges, need to be lubricated to prevent lead buildup in the bore. This lubricant can be applied either to the exposed portion of the heeled bullet, called outside lubricated, or on the portion inside the case, called inside lubricated. Outside lubrication requires a hard, dry lubricant, as anything soft or sticky will rub off or pick up dirt that comes in contact. Inside lubrication, on the other hand, can use sticky wax or grease, but then needs some means for the lubricant to reach the wall of the bore, since the diameter of the heel is smaller than the bore. While there were some methods patented to allow inside lubrication of heeled bullets (such as a piston at the base, which forces lubricant out of ports in the exposed sides of the bullet upon firing), they never became popular, due to the complexity and expense involved. Non-heeled bullets, however, can easily be lubricated on the portion inside the case using a grease groove packed with lubricant. This prevents the lubricant, usually a grease or wax, from picking up dirt and grit which can damage the bore.

== Surviving examples ==
Arguably, heeled bullets are still very common because, while very few calibers use them, the extremely popular .22 caliber rimfire cartridge family does, which includes .22 BB, .22 CB, .22 Short, .22 Long, .22 Long Rifle, and .22 Extra Long. The Long Rifle is the most commonly used cartridge in the world. A few other heeled-bullet cartridges are available, but they all originated in the mid to late 19th century. The recent rise in popularity of Cowboy Action Shooting has increased interest in these old cartridges, and there are even a few new replica firearms being made to chamber them.

== Cartridges evolved from heeled bullet designs ==
To convert a heeled-bullet cartridge to a non-heeled design, it was necessary to either enlarge the case diameter, or shrink the bullet and bore diameter. Examples of both choices can be found, but some of the more evident and confusing examples are cases where the bullet diameter was reduced.

Many shooters wonder why a .38 caliber firearm actually shoots bullets of .357 in (9.1 mm) diameter, and a .44 caliber firearm shoots bullets of .429 in (10.9 mm) diameter. In both of these cases, the name of the caliber derives from older heeled-bullet designs, and the name was kept even when the bullet was shrunk to fit inside the case. The .38 S&W cartridge, for example, dates from 1877 and has a nominal outside case diameter of .380 in (9.7 mm), while the inside of the case is .360 in (9.1 mm).

Older .38 caliber cartridges, like the .38 Short Colt, did use a heeled bullet, so rather than create a new ".35" or ".36 caliber, "Smith & Wesson kept the designation ".38" even though it no longer accurately reflected the groove diameter. The later .38 Special continued the trend, and even automatic pistol cartridges such as the .38 Super, .38 ACP, and .380 ACP retained the .38 caliber designation, even though they have calibers between .355 in (9.0 mm) and .357 in (9.1 mm). This continued until 1935 with the introduction of the .357 Magnum cartridge. However, the .44 Magnum cartridge, introduced in 1955, retained the designation of its parent .44 Special cartridge, even though it fired a .429 in (10.9 mm) bullet.
