= .22 Remington =

.22 Remington may refer to three different types of .22 caliber rifle cartridges:

- .22 Remington Automatic
- .22 Remington Jet
- .22 Winchester Rimfire (also known as the .22 Remington Special)
