= M51 =

M51 or M-51 may refer to:

- M-51 (Michigan highway), a state highway in Michigan
- M51 highway (Russia)
- M51 (Cape Town), a Metropolitan Route in Cape Town, South Africa
- M51 Skysweeper, an anti-aircraft gun
- M51 MACI mine
- M51 SLBM, a French nuclear ballistic missile
- BMW M51, a 1991 straight-6 Diesel engine
- Sherman M-51, an Israeli modification of American M4 Sherman tank
- Eidgenössischer Stutzer 1851, a historical service rifle of the Swiss Army
- Messier 51, a spiral galaxy also known as the Whirlpool Galaxy
- Samsung Galaxy M51, a smartphone released in 2020
