= .22 Remington Automatic =

Rifle cartridge

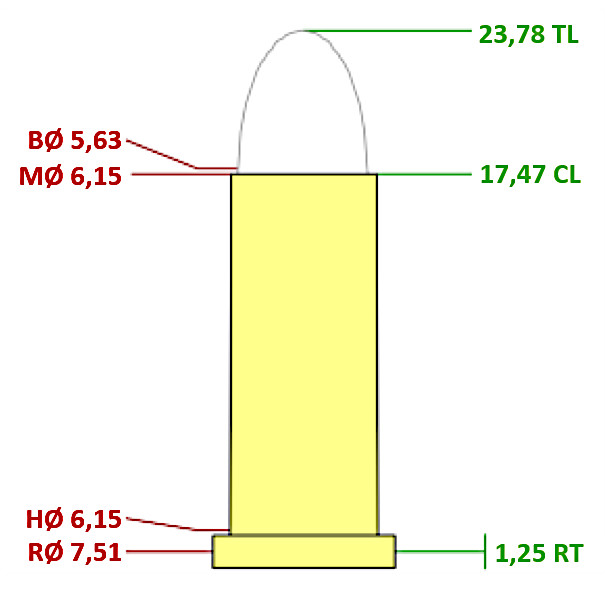
- .22 Remington Automatic cartridge dimensions in millimeters
- Type: Rifle
- Place of origin: United States

Production history
- Produced: 1916–1928

Specifications
- Case type: Rimmed, straight
- Bullet diameter: .223 in (5.7 mm)
- Neck diameter: .245 in (6.2 mm)
- Base diameter: .245 in (6.2 mm)
- Rim diameter: .290 in (7.4 mm)
- Case length: .663 in (16.8 mm)
- Overall length: .920 in (23.4 mm)
- Primer type: Rimfire
- Maximum pressure (CIP): 23,000 psi (160 MPa)

Ballistic performance
Bullet mass/type	Velocity	Energy
45 gr (3 g)	950 ft/s (290 m/s)	90 ft⋅lbf (120 J)
- Test barrel length: 22; Source(s): Barnes & Amber 1972

The .22 Remington Automatic / 5.7x23mmRF (also known as the .22 Remington Auto and occasionally .22 Rem Auto) is a .22in (5.6mm) American rimfire rifle cartridge.

Introduced for the Remington Model 16 semiautomatic rifle in 1916, the .22 Rem Auto was never used in any other firearm. It will not chamber correctly in other .22 rimfire weapons, nor will other .22 rimfire ammunition, including the dimensionally very similar .22 Winchester Automatic, interchange with it. This feature was to prevent use of black powder rounds, which were still popular when it first appeared, from being used in the Model 16, resulting in powder residue rapidly clogging the action and rendering the weapon inoperable.

The power of the .22 Remington Auto is comparable to the .22 Long rimfire, and while it fires a heavier bullet, it offers no performance edge on either the .22 Long or the very much more common .22 Long Rifle. It is not as accurate or as effective as the .22 LR, either.

== See also ==
- List of cartridges by caliber
- List of rifle cartridges
- List of rimfire cartridges
- 5mm caliber

== Notes ==
- Barnes, Frank C., ed. by John T. Amber. ".22 Remington Automatic", in Cartridges of the World, pp. 275, 282, & 283. Northfield, IL: DBI Books, 1972. ISBN 0-695-80326-3.
- ______ & _____. ".22 Winchester Automatic", in Cartridges of the World, pp. 275 & 283. Northfield, IL: DBI Books, 1972. ISBN 0-695-80326-3.
