= .41 Swiss =

Swiss rifle cartridge

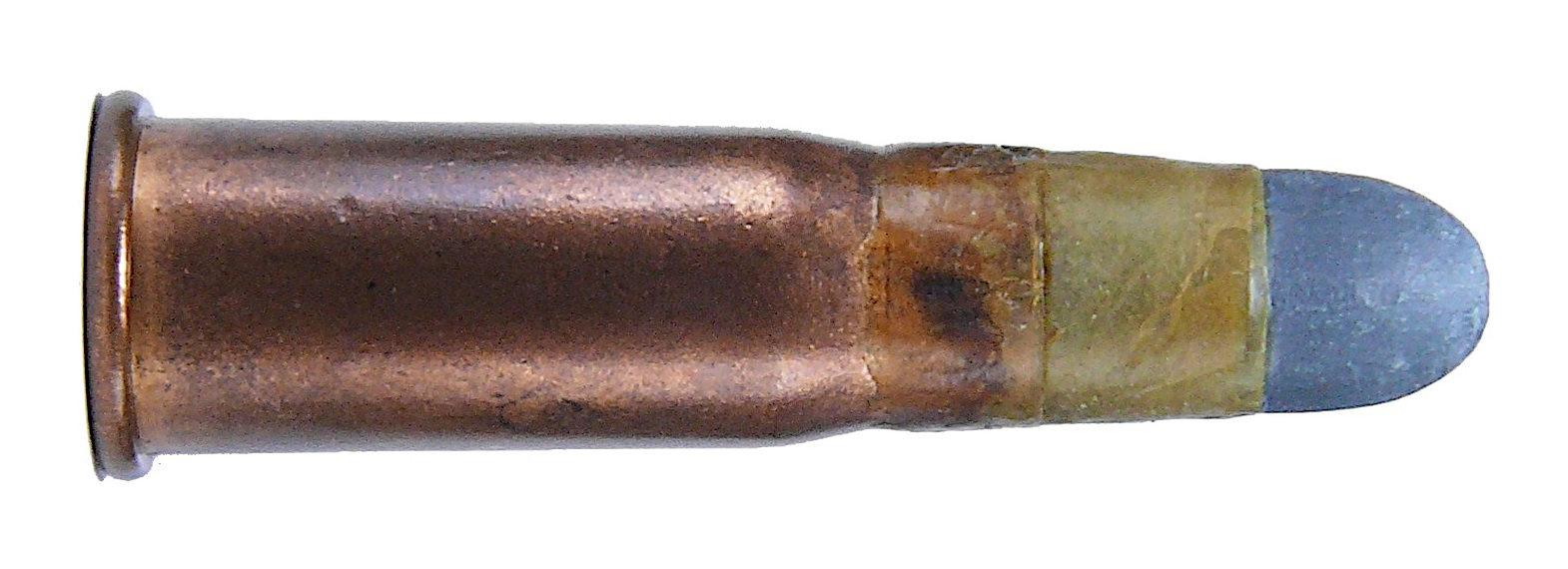
- 10.4x38mmR cartridge
- Type: Rifle
- Place of origin: Switzerland

Service history
- Used by: Swiss Army

Production history
- Produced: 1869–1889

Specifications
- Case type: Rimmed, bottleneck
- Bullet diameter: .415 in (10.5 mm)
- Neck diameter: .437 in (11.1 mm)
- Shoulder diameter: .518 in (13.2 mm)
- Base diameter: .540 in (13.7 mm)
- Rim diameter: .630 in (16.0 mm)
- Case length: 1.60 in (41 mm)
- Overall length: 2.20 in (56 mm)
- Primer type: Rimfire
- Maximum pressure: 14,000–16,000 psi (96.53–110.32 MPa)

Ballistic performance
Bullet mass/type	Velocity	Energy
334 gr (22 g)	1,345 ft/s (410 m/s)	1,330 ft⋅lbf (1,800 J)
- Sources: Barnes & Amber 1972

The .41 Swiss (officially the 10.4x38mmR Swiss cartridge used in the Swiss Vetterli M69/81 rifle) is a .415 in (10.5 mm) Swiss military rimfire bottlenecked intermediate rifle cartridge.

== History ==
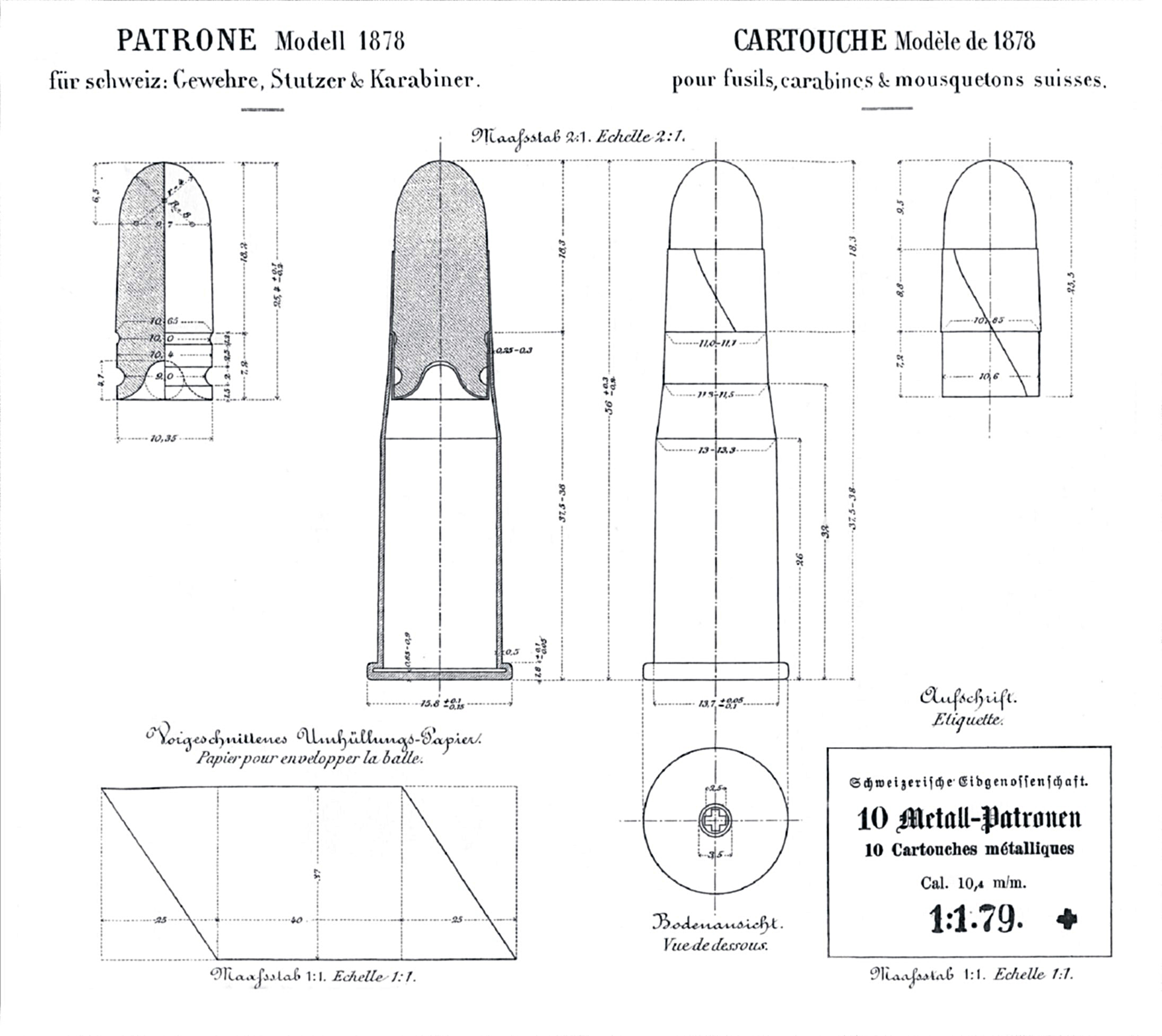
Schematic of the .41 Swiss Rimfire round

In 1867, the Swiss military adopted the 10.4×38mmR cartridge. As one of the few rimfire cartridges to see military service, the 313 gr (20.3 g) bullet and 1,400 ft/s (430 m/s) was respectable compared to its contemporaries. The most popular arms chambered for this round were the Vetterli series of rifles. This type of round was also used in the 1867 Peabody and the Milbank-Amsler swinging-block conversion rifles. Adopted in 1869 along with the Vetterli turn-bolt rifle, it was discontinued, along with the rifle, in 1889. With a 334 gr (21.6 g) bullet, it is adequate for deer, and only at short range.

The original round's case was made from copper which held a round nosed lead bullet. In 1871 and 1878, the paper patch was improved, but ballistic performance was only marginally improved.

The round continued to be commercially available in the U.S. until sometime after 1946 with 310 gr (20 g) bullets loaded by Winchester (K4154R) and 300 gr (19 g) lead bullets loaded by Remington (R326).

== See also ==
- List of cartridges by caliber
- List of handgun cartridges
- List of rimfire cartridges
- 10 mm caliber

== Notes ==
- Barnes, Frank C., ed. by John T. Amber. ".25 Short", in Cartridges of the World, pp. 196 & 205. Northfield, IL: DBI Books, 1972. ISBN 0-695-80326-3.
