= List of rimfire cartridges =

List of ammunition type

Below is a list of rimfire cartridges (RF), ordered by caliber, small to large. Rimfire ammunition is a type of metallic cartridge whose primer is located within a hollow circumferential rim protruding from the base of its casing.

The most common rimfire cartridges are chambered for .17 caliber and .22 caliber. The bullet diameter for .17 caliber firearms generally measure .172 inch (4.37 mm), while the bullet diameter for .22 caliber firearms generally measure .222 inch (5.64 mm).

== List ==
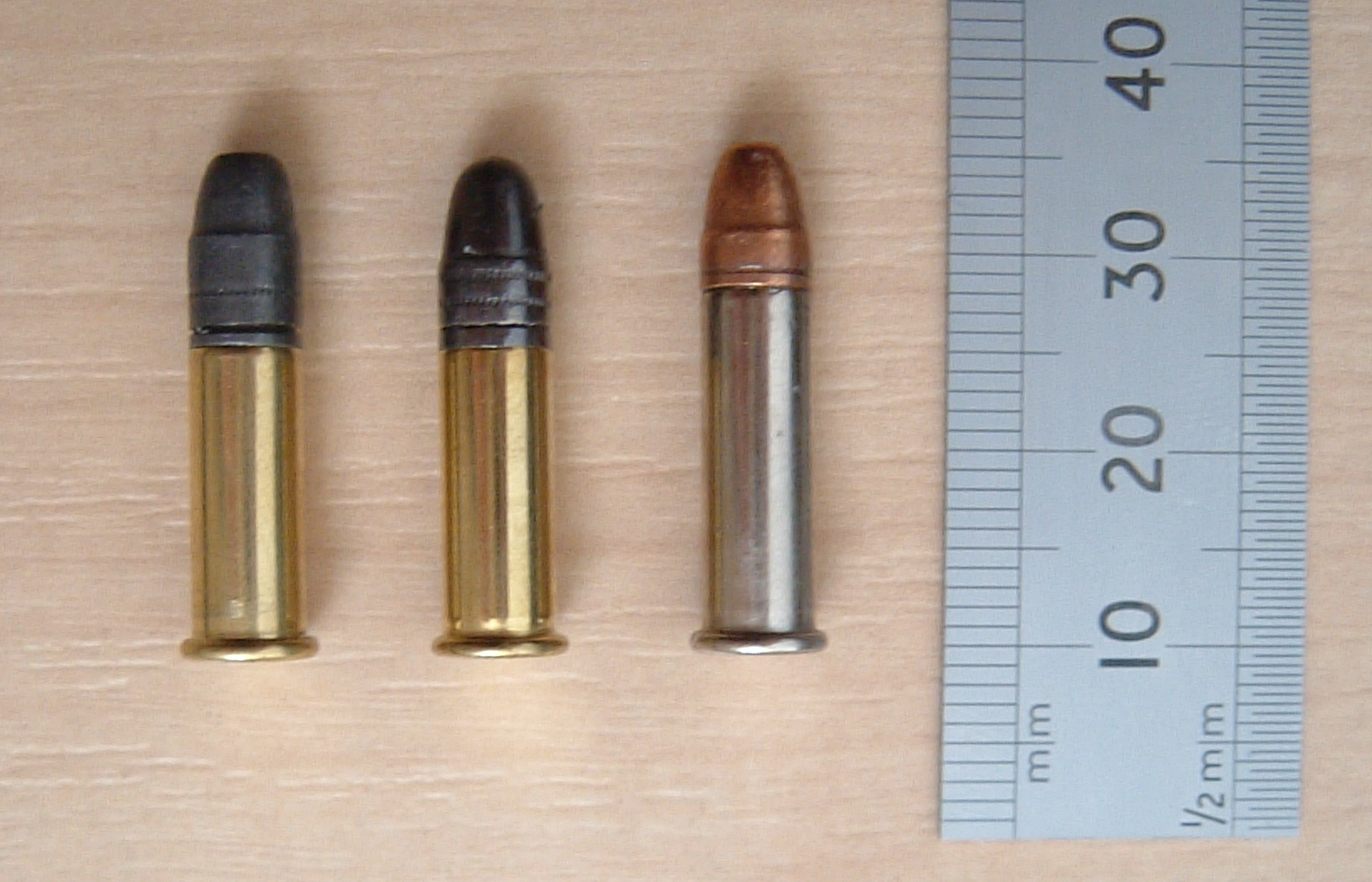
Examples of .22 Long Rifle rimfire cartridges, the most common ammunition in the world today in terms of units manufactured and sold.

=== Metric ===
- 2.34mm SwissMiniGun
- 4 mm Flobert Short (4mm Randz Court)
- 4 mm Flobert Long (4mm Randz Long/4mm Randz Lang/4mm Flobert Largo)
- 4.5×26mm MKR (4.5mm Interdynamic/4.5mm Kjellgren)
- 5mm Remington Rimfire Magnum (5mm RFM)
- 9mm Flobert
- 10.4×38mmRF (.41 Swiss)
- 12.17×42mmRF
- 14x33mmRF
- 17x28mmRF
- 17.5x29mmRF

=== Inches ===
- .14 Alton Jones
- .17 Hornady Mach 2 (.17 HM2)
- .17 Hornady Magnum Rimfire (.17 HMR)
- .17 Munisalva
- .17 PMC/Aguila (.17 High Standard)
- .17 Winchester Super Magnum (.17 WSM)
- .21 Sharp
- .22 BB Cap (Bulleted Breech Cap)
- .22 CB Cap (Conical Bullet Cap)
- .22 Short (.22 S)
- .22 Long (.22 L)
- .22 Long Rifle (.22 LR)
- .22 Extra Long (.22 EL)
- .22 ILARCO (.22 American/.22 Winchester Short Magnum Rimfire)
- .22 Winchester Rimfire (.22 Remington Special/.22 WRF)
- .22 Winchester Magnum Rimfire (.22 Magnum/.22 WMR)
- .22 Remington Automatic (.22 Rem Auto/.22 Remington Auto)
- .22 Winchester Automatic (.22 Win Auto/.22 Winchester Auto)
- .25 Short (.25 Bacon & Bliss)
- .25 Stevens Short
- .25 Stevens (.25 Stevens Long)
- .267 Remington
- .277 rimfire
- .30 rimfire
- .310 Remington Skeet
- .31 Eley
- .32 rimfire (.32 Short Rimfire/.32 Long Rimfire/.32 Extra Long)
- .340 rimfire revolver
- .35 Allen
- .38 rimfire (.38 Short/.38 Long/.38 Extra Long)
- .41 rimfire (.41 Short/.41 Long)
- .41 Short Rimfire (.41 Short)
- .41 Swiss
- .42 Allen
- .44 Short & Long
- .440
- .442 Eley
- .44 Henry (.44 Henry Flat/.44 Rimfire/.44 Long Rimfire)
- .45 Danish
- .46 rimfire (.46 Short/.46 Long)
- .50 Remington Navy
- .50 Government
- .56-56 Spencer
- .58 Berdan Carbine
- .58 Berdan Musket
- .58 Gatling
- .58 Joslyn carbine
- .58 Mont Storm
- .58 Miller
- .58 Musket
- 1" Gatling (only one specimen known)

== See also ==
- Snake shot
- Garden gun
- Wildcat cartridge
- Centerfire ammunition
- List of rebated rim cartridges
