= Vetterli rifle =

Swiss army rifle

Repetiergewehr Vetterli, Modell 1869/71
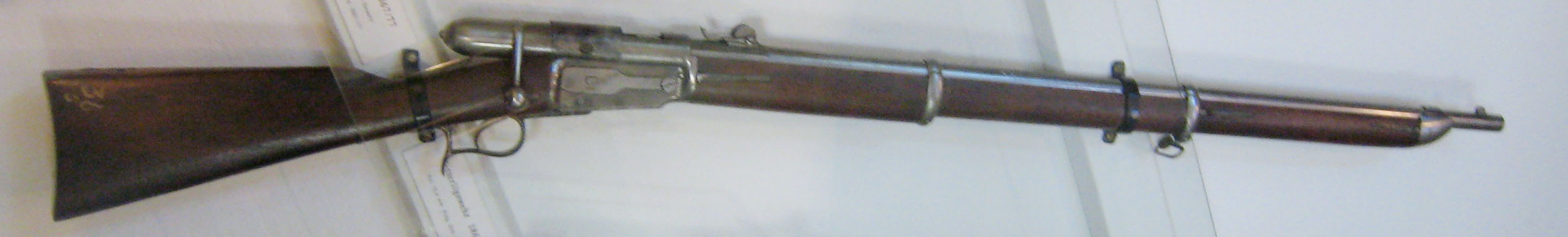
- Swiss Vetterli Model 1868
- Type: Service rifle
- Place of origin: Switzerland

Service history
- In service: 1869–1889
- Used by: Swiss Army, Paraguay; Finnish White Guard; Russian Army (captured from shipment to Finland); United Mine Workers; Home Guard
- Wars: Argentine Civil Wars (limited); 1904 Paraguayan Revolution; World War I (Russian captured); Russian Civil War; Finnish Civil War; Coal Wars

Production history
- Designer: Johann-Friedrich Vetterli
- Manufacturer: SIG and Waffenfabrik Bern
- No. built: 36,700

Specifications
- Mass: 4600 g (10.14 lb)
- Length: 1300mm (51.18 in)
- Barrel length: 842mm (33.15 in)
- Cartridge: 10.4×38mm Swiss Rimfire; Black-powder rimfire rimmed metallic cartridge
- Caliber: 10mm
- Action: Bolt-action
- Rate of fire: 21 rounds per minute
- Muzzle velocity: 1425 ft/s
- Feed system: 11-round tubular magazine
- Sights: Iron sights (Quadrantenvisier)

The Vetterli rifles were a series of Swiss army service rifles in use from 1869 to 1889, when they were replaced with Schmidt–Rubin rifles. Modified Vetterlis were also used by the Italian Army.

The Swiss Vetterli rifles combined the American Winchester Model 1866's tubular magazine with a regular bolt featuring for the first time two opposed rear locking lugs. This novel type of bolt was a major improvement over the simpler Dreyse and Chassepot bolt actions. The Vetterli was also the first repeating bolt-action rifle to feature a self-cocking action, small caliber bore, and the first known standard issue of the intermediate round, which gave controllable handling and a large magazine capacity of 11 rounds, which was more than any other rifle of the time, predating the Lee–Metford.

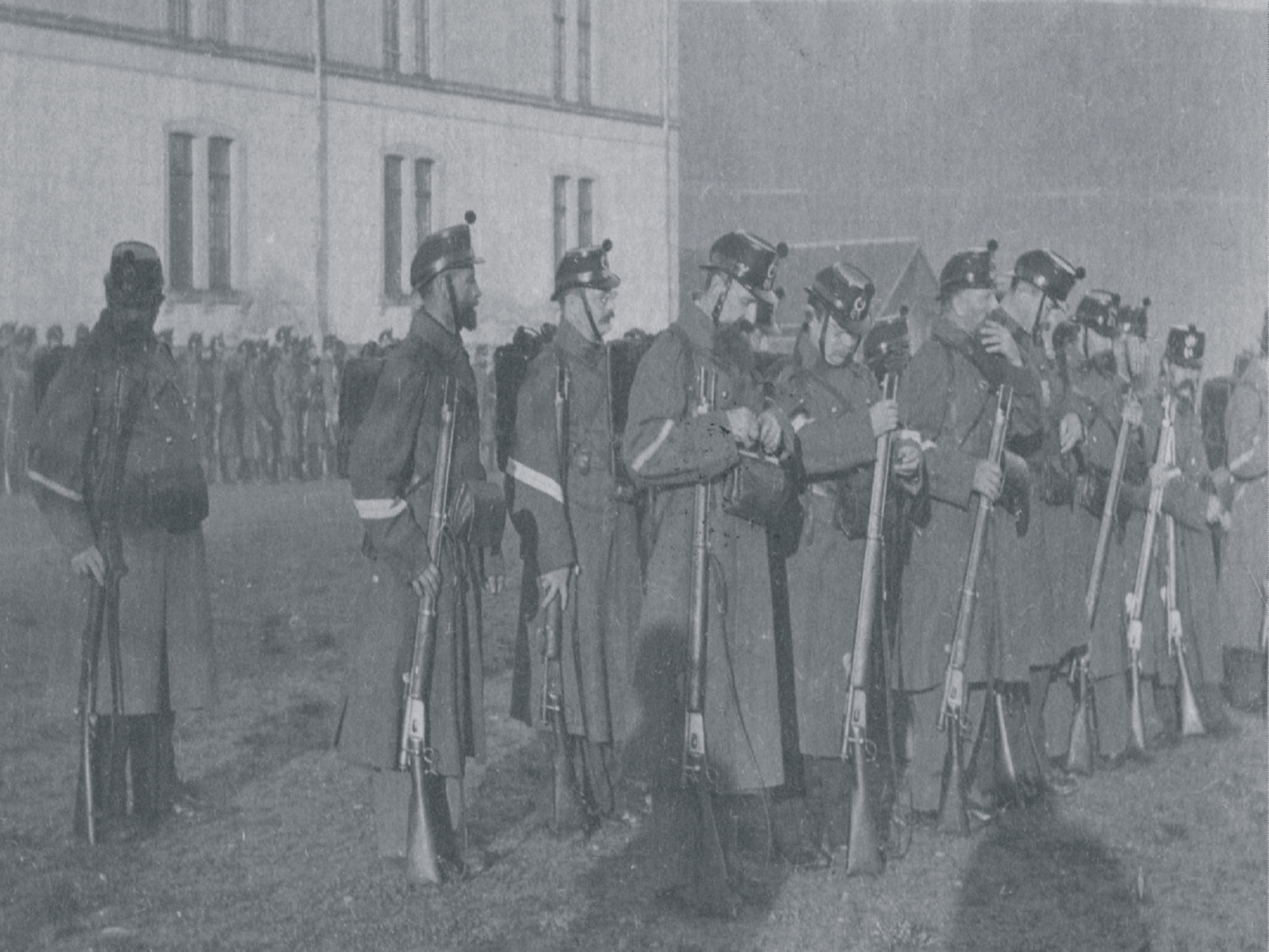
Swiss Soldiers armed with M69/71 Rifles

Due to the Swiss Federal Council's early 1866 decision to equip the army with a breechloading repeating rifle, the Vetterli rifles were, at the time of their introduction, the most advanced military rifles in Europe. The Vetterli was the replacement for the Eidgenössischer Stutzer 1851, an Amsler-Milbank metallic cartridge conversion from previous Swiss muzzle-loading rifles.

== Repetiergewehr Vetterli, Modell 1867 ==
The model 1867 was the first iteration of Vetterli rifles. It was accepted into service in February 1868. The model 1867, like its successors, featured a 12-round under barrel tubular magazine and bolt action feed system. The primary distinguishing feature of the Model 1867 was the external hammer.

== Repetiergewehr Vetterli, Modell 1868 ==
Before the Model 1867 was put into full production, the rifle designer, Johann Friedrich Vetterli, updated the rifle by replacing the external hammer with an internal cocking bolt spring, rounded front barrel band and placing the cleaning rod on the left side of the rifle. It was discovered soon after that the cleaning rod in its current placement was easily damaged and was subsequently moved to the under-barrel position. The model was designated the Model 1869.

== Repetiergewehr Vetterli, Modell 1869, 69/71 ==
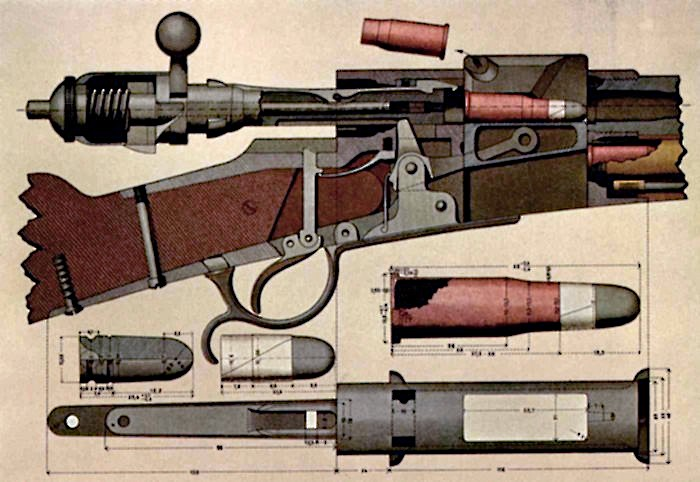
Cutaway diagram of the Vetterli rifle's action.

The 1869 Repetiergewehr Vetterli (English: repeating rifle, Vetterli) was the first iteration of Vetterli rifles to go into full mass production. It was designed by Johann-Friedrich Vetterli (1822–1882), a Swiss riflemaker, who worked in France and England before becoming director of the Schweizerische Industrie Gesellschaft's armament factory in Neuhausen Switzerland. He also adapted his rifle into a single-shot centerfire variant procured by the Italian Army. In 1871 the Model 1869 was updated by removing the loading gate and magazine cutoff switch. This change was designated the Model 1869/71

== Repetiergewehr Vetterli, Modell 1871 ==
Repetiergewehr Vetterli, Modell 1871

Production history
- No. built: 77,300

Specifications
- Mass: c. 4750 g

Even while manufacture of the M1869/71 was underway, a new 1871 model was put into production. It omitted some redundant parts and featured a modified sight as well as a stronger barrel and stronger iron hoops.

== Repetierstutzer Vetterli, Modell 1871 ==
Repetierstutzer Vetterli, Modell 1871
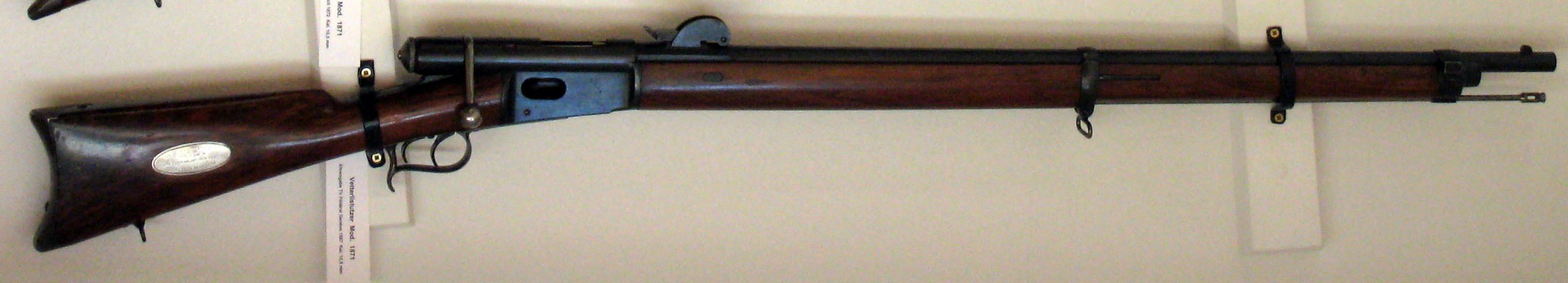

Production history
- No. built: 10,000

Specifications
- Mass: 4,600 g (10.1 lb)
- Length: 1,260 mm (50 in)
- Barrel length: 783 mm (30.8 in)
- Feed system: 13 round tube magazine

The Stutzer (carbine) variant of the 1871 rifle was used to equip the Scharfschützen (sharpshooter) companies of the army. The Stutzer were equipped with a sensitive Stecher (double set trigger) action and featured a shorter barrel.

== Kavallerie-Repetierkarabiner Vetterli, Modell 1871 ==
Kavallerie-Repetierkarabiner Vetterli, Modell 1871
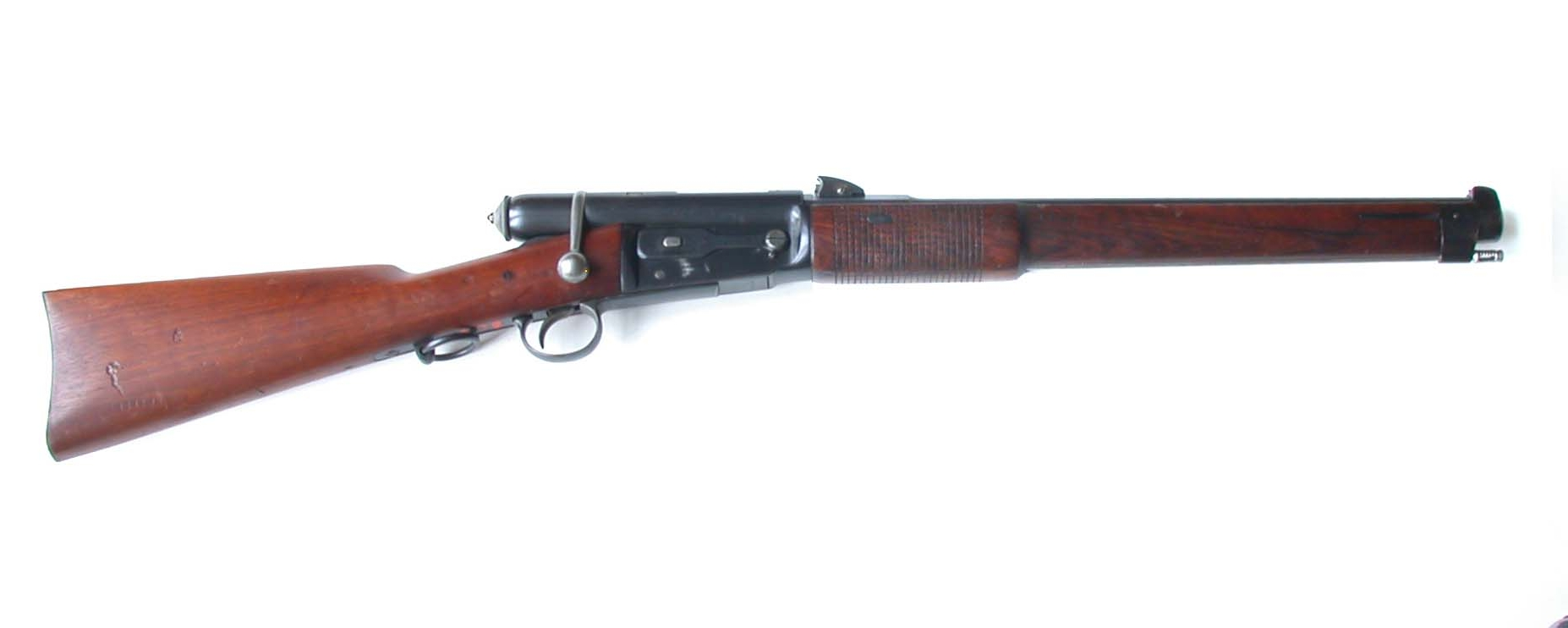

Production history
- Manufacturer: W+F Bern, SIG
- No. built: c. 4300

Specifications
- Mass: 3,300 g (7.3 lb)
- Length: 930 mm (37 in)
- Barrel length: 470 mm (19 in)
- Feed system: 6-round tubular magazine

The Kavallerie-Repetierkarabiner (English: cavalry repeating carbine) was another shortened variant of the 1871 rifle for use by the cavalry, which at that time was still armed with percussion pistols.

== Repetiergewehr and -stutzer Vetterli, Modell 1878 and 1881 ==
Repetiergewehr and -stutzer Vetterli, Modell 1878 and 1881

Production history
- Manufacturer: W+F Bern
- No. built: 114,000 (rifle), c. 11,000 (stutzer)

Specifications
- Mass: c. 4,700 g (10.4 lb)
- Length: 1,325 mm (52.2 in)
- Barrel length: 843 mm (33.2 in)
- Feed system: 12-round tubular magazine

To accelerate the sluggish production of the Vetterli rifles, the federal authorities built a new arms factory in Bern, the Eidgenössische Waffenfabrik (W+F), in 1875. That factory produced the 1878 variant of the Vetterli rifle. Its some 25 improvements included a new bayonet and lug, improved sights and a finger hook on the trigger guard. A Stutzer variant with a Stecher action, but otherwise identical to the rifle, was also produced.

== M1870 Italian Vetterli ==
The Italian Army adopted a modified Vetterli design, however as a single-shot, in 1870. Unlike the Swiss model, it was chambered for a centrefire cartridge, the 10.35×47mmR.

=== M1870/87 Italian Vetterli-Vitali ===
In 1887, the Italian military updated its single-shot Model 1870 Vetterli rifles with a four-round Vitali box magazine

=== M1870/87/15 Italian Vetterli ===
During World War I, like many nations, Italy faced a shortage of modern infantry rifles. As a stop-gap measure, hundreds of thousands of Vetterli-Vitali rifles and a few carbines and musquetoons were converted in Rome and Gardone to fire the 6.5x52mm Carcano round, by adding a 6.5 mm barrel liner and a Carcano-style magazine. These conversions were never meant for extended firing with standard 6.5×52mm loads, as the smokeless powder 6.5×52mm cartridge generates higher pressure than the black powder 10.35×47mmR.

=== M1882 Italian Vetterli-Bertolo & M1890 Vetterli-Ferraciu ===
In 1882 the Regia Marina adopted a variant of the Vetterli rifle for use by Marines, the Vetterli-Berolo. It was fed by a 9-round tubular magazine rather than a box magazine like the Vetterli-Vitali. The bayonet lug and cleaning rod were located on the sides of the rifle due to the tube magazine. In 1890 these would be converted to 4-round box magazine fed rifles and named the Vetterli-Ferraciu (or 1890 Navy Model).

== Prototypes by Sharps Rifle Co. ==
In 1877-1878, Sharps Rifle Company modified Vetterli action with a different receiver and cartridge-feeding mechanism for the Magazine Rifle Board competition, but despite several prototypes refined by Hugo Borchardt, not a single one was adopted.

== Coal Wars ==
During the Coal Wars, a series of U.S. labor conflicts, Vetterli rifles were sought after not only as a bear rifle but as a self defense rifle called the "poor man’s bear gun”. During the Battle of Blair Mountain, Vetterli rifles were often used by coal miners as combat rifles.

== Civilian use ==
Surplus Vetterli rifles were used in "surprising number" by civilians in the U.S. for hunting deer through 1972.
