= .50 Remington Navy =

American rimfire handgun cartridge

- Type: Handgun
- Place of origin: United States

Production history
- Produced: 1865–1866

Specifications
- Case type: Rimmed, straight
- Bullet diameter: .510 in (13.0 mm)
- Neck diameter: .535 in (13.6 mm)
- Shoulder diameter: .535 in (13.6 mm)
- Base diameter: .562 in (14.3 mm)
- Rim diameter: .642 in (16.3 mm)
- Case length: .860 in (21.8 mm)
- Overall length: 1.28 in (33 mm)
- Primer type: Rimfire
- Maximum pressure: 12,000–15,000 psi (82.74 to 103.42 MPa)

Ballistic performance
Bullet mass/type	Velocity	Energy
290 gr (19 g)	600 ft/s (180 m/s)	234 ft⋅lbf (317 J)
- Sources: Barnes & Amber 1972

The .50 Remington Navy (13x21mmRF) is a .50 in (12.7 mm) American rimfire handgun cartridge.

== History ==
Introduced for the Remington Navy single-shot, rolling block pistol in 1865, the low-velocity round loaded a 290 gr (19 g; 0.66 oz) bullet over 23 gr (1.5 g; 0.053 oz) of black powder.

The rimfire version was replaced in 1866 by a centerfire equivalent. A Boxer-primed version remained commercially available until World War I.

The power of the .50 Remington was less than average, but the heavy bullet, even at comparatively low velocity, made it "a rather potent handgun round".

== See also ==
- .50 caliber handguns
- List of cartridges by caliber
- List of handgun cartridges
- List of rimfire cartridges
- 13 mm caliber

== Notes ==
- Barnes, Frank C. (1972). ".50 Remington Navy". In John T. Amber (ed.). Cartridges of the World. Northfield, Illinois: DBI Books. pp. 280, 282, & 283. ISBN 0-695-80326-3.
