= .22 extra long =

Rimfire rifle and handgun cartridge

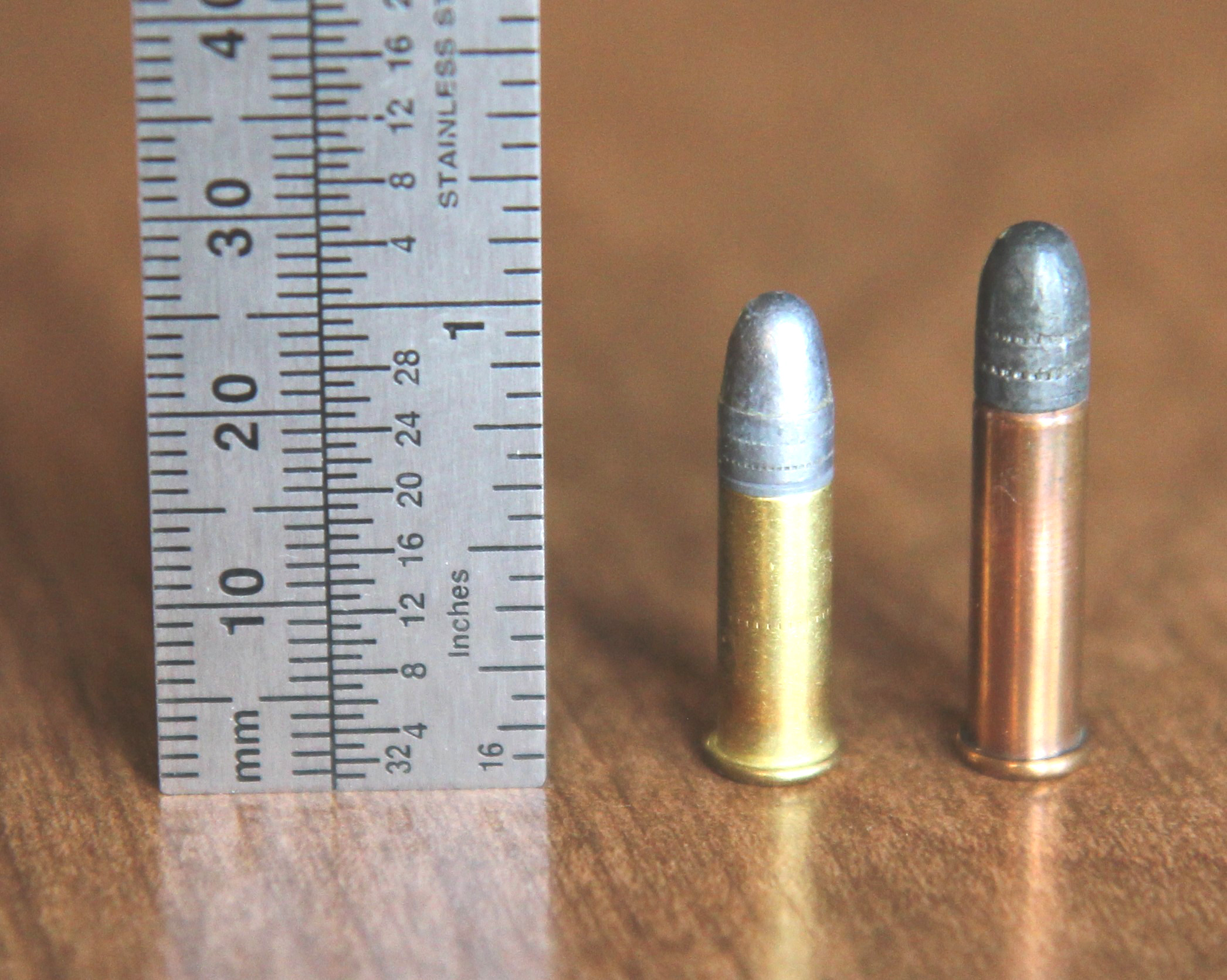
- .22 long rifle (left) and .22 extra long (right).
- Type: Rifle
- Place of origin: United States

Production history
- Produced: 1880–1935

Specifications
- Case type: Rimmed, straight
- Bullet diameter: .223 in (5.7 mm)
- Neck diameter: .225 in (5.7 mm)
- Base diameter: .225 in (5.7 mm)
- Rim diameter: .275 in (7.0 mm)
- Rim thickness: .043 in (1.1 mm)
- Case length: .750 in (19.1 mm)
- Overall length: 1.16 in (29 mm)
- Primer type: rimfire
- Maximum pressure (CIP): 26,000 psi (180 MPa)

Ballistic performance
Bullet mass/type	Velocity	Energy
40 gr (3 g) (late smokeless)	1,050 ft/s (320 m/s)	98 ft⋅lbf (133 J)
- Sources: Barnes & Amber 1972

The .22 extra long is a .22 in (5.6 mm) American rimfire rifle and handgun cartridge.

== Background ==
Introduced in 1880, the .22 extra long was used in Remington, Ballard, Wesson, Stevens, and later (1916) models of Winchester's M1902 and M1904 single-shot bolt-action rifles, as well as in Smith & Wesson revolvers.

Using the same 40 gr (2.6 g) outside-lubricated bullet later adapted for the much more common .22 long rifle, the extra long was loaded with 6 gr (389 mg) of black powder. Originally, it slightly outperformed the .22 LR, but was "not noted for great accuracy", while later smokeless loads achieved about the same muzzle velocity as the .22 LR.

As with the .22 Winchester Automatic and .22 Remington Automatic, the .22 extra long will not chamber correctly in .22 long rifle weapons. Because it is very dimensionally-similar, however, the shorter .22 short, .22 long, and .22 LR will chamber in weapons designed for it (in the same way a .38 Special cartridge can be loaded into a .357 Magnum revolver, or a .44 Special cartridge can be loaded into a .44 Magnum) revolver.

The power of the .22 extra long is comparable to the standard velocity .22 long rifle, which is much more commonly chambered and sold.

The .22 extra long ceased to be offered commercially in 1935.

== See also ==
- .22 BB
- .22 CB
- .22 short
- .22 long
- .22 long rifle
- .22 Winchester Magnum Rimfire
- .22 Hornet
- List of rimfire cartridges
- 5mm caliber
- List of cartridges by caliber
- List of rifle cartridges
- List of rimfire cartridges

== Notes ==
- Barnes, Frank C., ed. by John T. Amber. ".22 Extra Long", in Cartridges of the World, pp. 274, 282, & 283. Northfield, IL: DBI Books, 1972. ISBN 0-695-80326-3.
