= Eidgenössischer Stutzer 1851 =

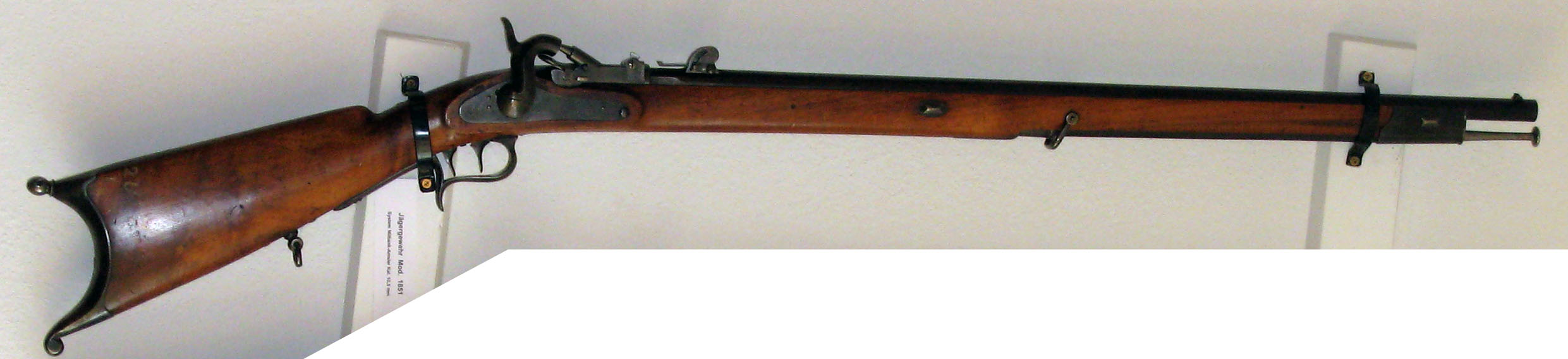
- Eidgenössischer Stutzer 1851 (Breechloader model 1867)
- Type: Service rifle
- Place of origin: Switzerland

Service history
- In service: 1851 – c. 1863
- Used by: Swiss Army

Production history
- Manufacturer: Beuret Frères à Liège and private manufacturers
- No. built: 6,400
- Variants: M1867 breechloader refit

Specifications
- Mass: 4500 g
- Length: 1260 mm
- Barrel length: 813 mm
- Caliber: 10.5 mm
- Action: Caplock
- Feed system: Muzzleloader
- Sights: Iron sights (Quadrantenvisier)

The Eidgenössischer Stutzer 1851 (English: Federal Carbine 1851), also called Feldstutzer 1851, was the first service rifle used by the Swiss armed forces to be procured by the federal government, which was responsible for the armament of the Cantonal armed forces under the 1848 federal constitution. It was also the first military weapon in Europe to use the smaller 10.5 mm caliber (later reduced to 10.4 mm) instead of the prior de facto standard of 18 mm.

The Stutzer was refitted with a Milbank Amsler breechloading system (à tabatière) in 1867. It was replaced by the Repetiergewehr Vetterli, Modell 1869/70 in 1869.
