= .22 long rifle =

.22 caliber rimfire cartridge used in rifles, pistols, revolvers, and submachine guns

.22 Long Rifle
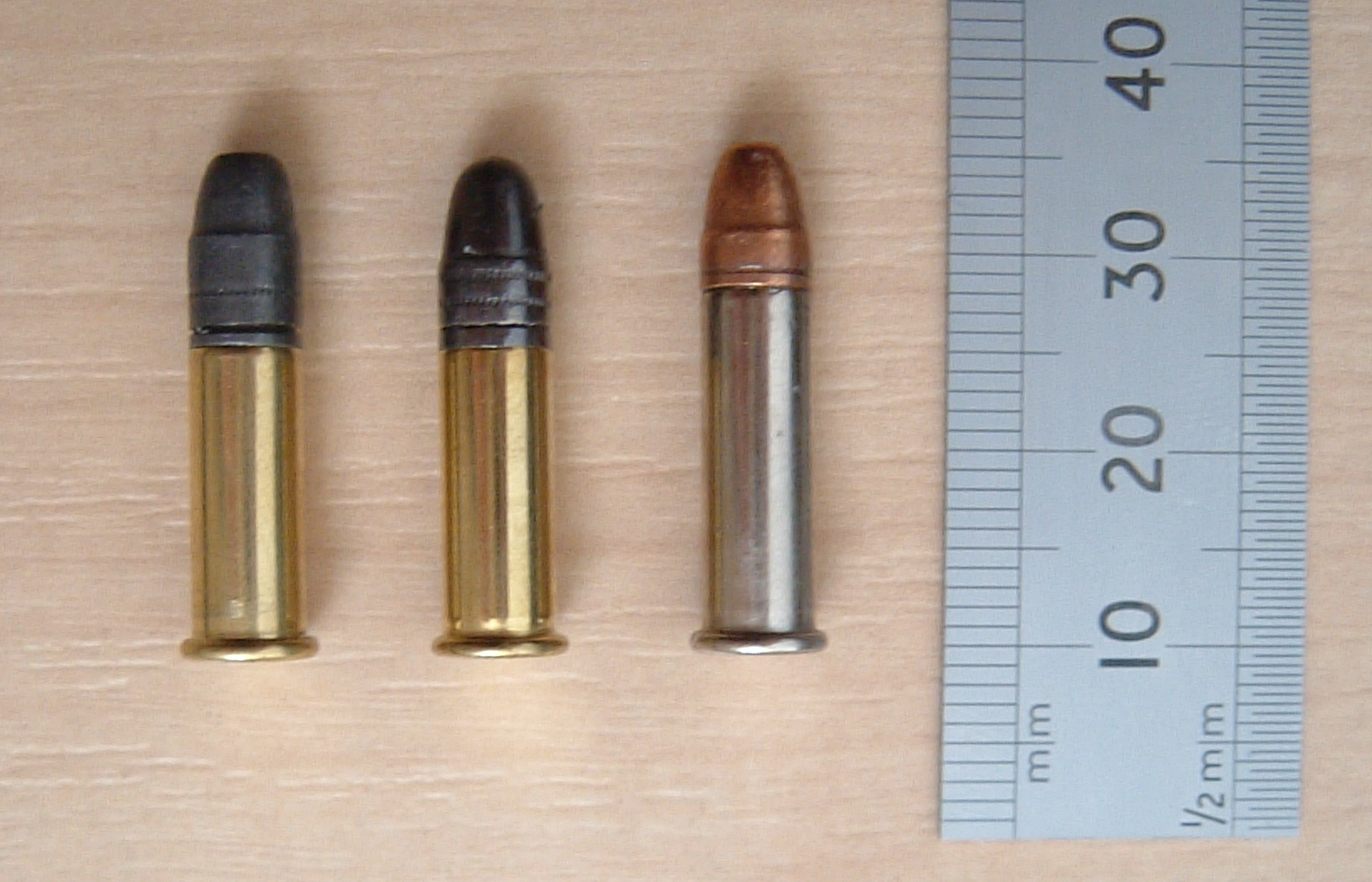
- .22 long rifle cartridges. The two .22 Long Rifle cartridges on the left have a standard case length of .613 in (15.6 mm). The .22 Long Rifle on the right has a slightly longer case length of .702 in (17.8 mm) and is a ultra high-velocity .22 Long Rifle "Stinger" cartridge that uses lighter 30–32-grain (1.9–2.1 g) bullets.
- Type: Pistol, rifle, revolver
- Place of origin: United States

Production history
- Designer: J. Stevens Arms & Tool Company
- Designed: 1887
- Produced: 1887–present
- Variants: .22 Long Rifle standard, high-velocity, hyper-velocity

Specifications
- Parent case: .22 long
- Case type: Rimmed, straight
- Bullet diameter: .223 in (5.7 mm) – .2255 in (5.73 mm)
- Land diameter: .212 in (5.4 mm)
- Neck diameter: .226 in (5.7 mm)
- Base diameter: .226 in (5.7 mm)
- Rim diameter: .278 in (7.1 mm)
- Rim thickness: .043 in (1.1 mm)
- Case length: .613 in (15.6 mm)
- Overall length: 1.000 in (25.4 mm)
- Rifling twist: 1:16"
- Primer type: Rimfire
- Maximum pressure: 24,000 psi (170 MPa)

Ballistic performance
Bullet mass/type	Velocity	Energy
40 gr (2.6 g) solid	1260 (HV high-velocity)	131 ft⋅lbf (178 J)
36 gr (2.3 g) copper-plated HP	1,328 ft/s (405 m/s)	134 ft⋅lbf (182 J)
32 gr (2.1 g) copper-plated HP	1,430 ft/s (440 m/s)	141 ft⋅lbf (191 J)
31 gr (2.0 g) copper-plated RN	1,750 ft/s (530 m/s)	204 ft⋅lbf (277 J)
30 gr (1.9 g) copper-plated HP	1,640 ft/s (500 m/s)	191 ft⋅lbf (259 J)
- Test barrel length: 18.5 in (470 mm); Source

The .22 long rifle (.22LR), also known as the 5.6×15mmR, is a long-established variety of .22 caliber rimfire ammunition originating from the United States. It is used in a wide range of firearms, including rifles, pistols, revolvers, and submachine guns.

In terms of quantities sold, the .22 Long Rifle is by far the most common ammunition that is currently manufactured and sold in the world. Common uses include hunting and shooting sports. Ammunition produced in .22 Long Rifle is effective at short ranges, has little recoil, and is inexpensive to purchase, making it ideal for plinking and marksmanship training.

== History ==
American cartridge manufacturer J. Stevens Arms & Tool Company introduced the .22 long rifle cartridge in 1887. The round owes its origin to the .22 BB Cap of 1845 and the .22 short of 1857. It combined the case of the .22 long of 1871 with a 40-grain (2.6 g) bullet and heavier powder charge, giving a higher muzzle velocity of approximately 1,048 feet per second (320 m/s) in the original loading. This performance effectively rendered the older .22 extra long cartridge obsolete. The .22 LR uses a heeled bullet, which means that the bullet is the same diameter as the case, and has a narrower "heel" portion that fits inside the case. It is one of the few cartridges accepted by a wide variety of rifles and handguns. In 1930, a high velocity (HV) loading of the Long Rifle cartridge was introduced by Remington Arms, giving a muzzle velocity of around 1,260 ft/s (384 m/s) from a rifle barrel.

== Popularity ==
The .22 LR cartridge is popular with both novice shooters and experts. Its minimal recoil and relatively low noise make it an ideal cartridge for recreational shooting, small-game hunting, and pest control. Military cadets and others commonly use .22 LR cadet rifles for basic firearms and marksmanship training. The Boy Scouts of America use it for the rifle shooting merit badge.

The cartridge's low recoil makes it ideal for introductory firearms courses. Novice shooters can be surprised or frightened by the noise and recoil of more powerful rounds. Beginners shooting firearms beyond their comfort level frequently develop a habit of flinching in an attempt to counter anticipated recoil. The resulting habit impedes correct posture and follow-through at the most critical phase of the shot and is difficult to correct. With high recoil eliminated, other errors in marksmanship technique are easier to identify and correct.

Many handgun manufacturers offer an upper pistol conversion kit to allow the pistol to shoot .22 LR ammunition. These conversions allow shooters to practice inexpensively while retaining the handling characteristics of their chosen firearms (with reduced recoil and muzzle blast). Additionally, .22 LR cartridge conversion kits allow practice at indoor ranges which prohibit high-power firearms. Owners of guns that use gas systems, such as AR-15 sport style rifles, normally avoid firing non-plated .22 LR cartridge ammunition, as the use of non-plated ammunition may cause lead fouling of the gas port inside the barrel and costly gunsmithing procedures. This can usually be mitigated by swapping the conversion kit for the standard bolt carrier group and firing several full-powered rounds to clear the gas port and tube of any accumulated lead fouling. While not 100% effective, the extremely hot, incandescent gases produced by centerfire rifle ammunition will help clear any lead fouling from .22 LR ammunition.

A wide variety of .22 LR ammunition is commercially available, and it varies widely in price and performance. Bullet weights among commercially available ammunition range from 20 to 60 grains (1.3 to 3.9 g), and velocities vary from 575 to 1,750 ft/s (175 to 533 m/s). .22 LR is the least costly firearm cartridge ammunition available around the world. Promotional loads for plinking can be purchased in bulk for significantly less cost than precision target rounds. The low cost of ammunition has a substantial effect on the popularity of the .22 LR. For this reason, rimfire cartridges are commonly used for target practice.

.22 LR cartridges are commonly packaged in boxes of 50 or 100 rounds, and are often sold by the 'brick', a carton containing either 10 boxes of 50 rounds or loose cartridges totaling 500 rounds, or the 'case' containing 10 bricks totaling 5,000 rounds. Annual production is estimated at 2–2.5 billion rounds by some. The NSSF estimates that a large percentage of the US production of 10 billion cartridges is composed of .22 LR. Despite the high production figures there have occasionally been shortages of .22 LR cartridge in the contiguous United States, most notably during the U.S. ammunition shortage of the late 2000s and early 2010s.

== Performance ==
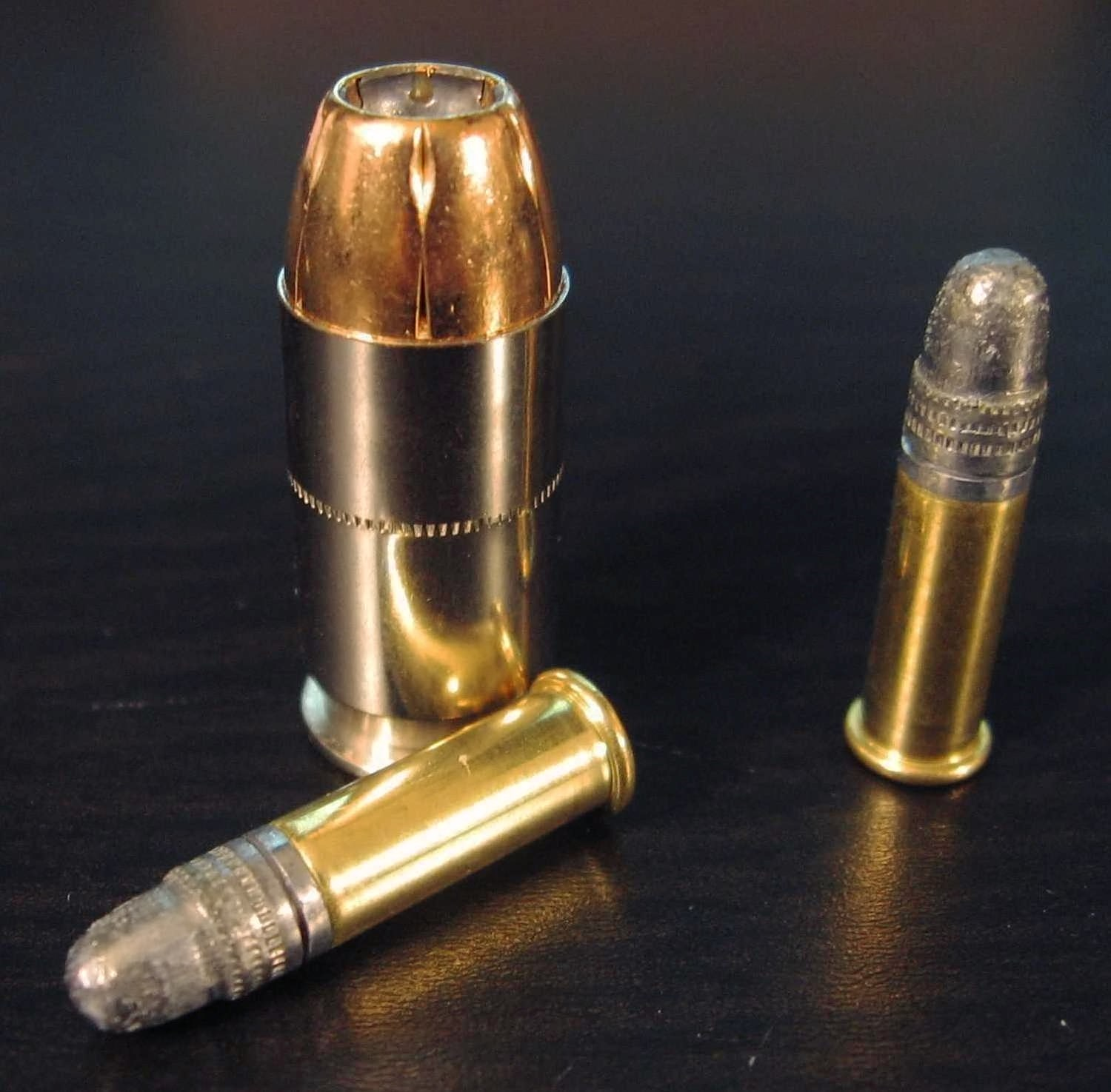
Two .22 LR rounds compared to a .45 ACP cartridge

The .22 LR is effective to 150 yd (140 m), though practical ranges tend to be less. After 150 yd (140 m), the ballistics of the round are such that it will be difficult to compensate for the large "drop". The relatively short effective range, low report, and light recoil have made it a favorite for use as a target-practice cartridge. The cartridge's accuracy is good but not exceptional; other cartridges can achieve the same or better accuracy. A contributing factor in rifles is the transition of even a high-velocity cartridge projectile from supersonic to subsonic within 100 yd (91 m). As the bullet slows, the shock wave generated by supersonic travel overtakes it, disrupting its flight path and causing minor but measurable inaccuracies.

When zeroed for 100 yards (91 m), the arc-trajectory of the high-velocity .22 LR loading with a 40 gr (2.6 g) bullet has a 2.7-inch (69 mm) rise at 50 yards (46 m), and a 10.8-inch (27 cm) drop at 150 yards (140 m). A .22 LR rifle needs to be zeroed for 75 yards (69 m) to avoid overshooting small animals like squirrels and rabbits at intermediate distances.

As a hunting cartridge, rimfires are mainly used to kill small game animals up to the size of coyotes. Although proper shot placement can kill larger animals such as deer or hog, it is not recommended because its low power may not guarantee a humane kill. In 2013, an elephant was killed by multiple shots from a .22 LR rifle.

Because a .22 LR bullet is smaller and less powerful than most larger cartridges, its danger to humans is often underestimated. However, a .22 LR bullet is easily capable of killing or injuring humans. Even after flying 400 yards (370 m), a .22 bullet is still traveling at about 500 ft/s (150 m/s). Ricochets are more common in .22 LR projectiles than for more powerful cartridges as the combination of unjacketed lead and moderate velocities allows the projectile to deflect – not penetrate or disintegrate – when hitting hard objects at a glancing angle. A .22 LR bullet can ricochet off the surface of water at a low angle of aim. Severe injury may result to a person or object in the line of fire on the opposite shore, several hundred yards or meters away. A .22 LR bullet is capable of traveling 2,000 yards (1,800 m), which is more than 1 mile (1.6 km).

Rimfire bullets are generally either plain lead with a wax coating (for subsonic-velocity or standard-velocity loads) or plated with copper or gilding metal (for high-velocity or hyper-velocity loads). The thin copper layer on a plated bullet functions as a lubricant, reducing friction between the bullet and the barrel and thus reducing barrel wear. Plating also prevents oxidation of the lead bullet. Lead tends to oxidize if stored for long periods. On a plain lead bullet, oxide on the bullet's surface can increase its diameter enough to either prevent insertion of the cartridge into the chamber, or – with high velocity rounds – cause dangerously high pressures in the barrel, potentially rupturing the cartridge case and injuring the shooter; for that reason, standard and subsonic cartridges usually use a wax lubricant on lead bullets.

== Variants ==
The variety of .22 LR loads is often divided into four distinct categories, based on nominal velocity:

- Subsonic-velocity: 1,100 feet per second (340 m/s) and under
- Standard-velocity: 1,000–1,100 feet per second (300–340 m/s)
- High-velocity: 1,200–1,310 feet per second (370–400 m/s)
- Hyper-velocity/Ultra-velocity: 1,400 feet per second (430 m/s) and over

=== Subsonic-velocity ===
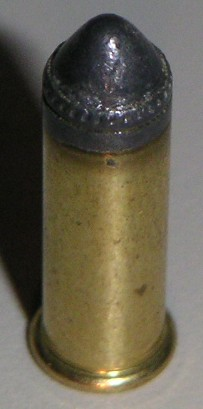
The subsonic Aguila Super Colibri

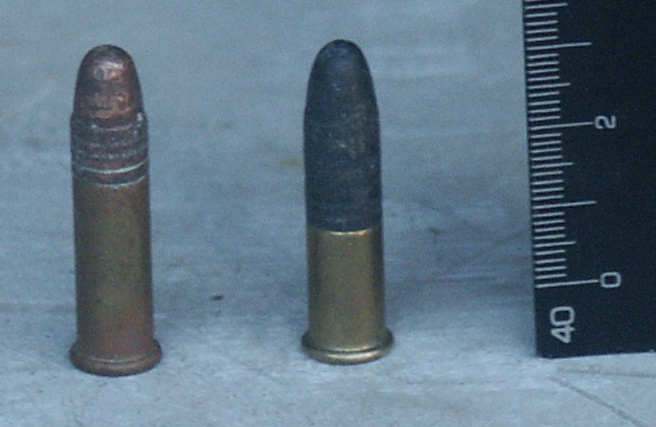
.22 caliber Aguila Sniper Sub-Sonic (right) with .22 long rifle for comparison

Subsonic rounds have a muzzle velocity of less than the speed of sound (about 1,080 ft/s or 330 m/s). These rounds are sometimes equipped with extra-heavy bullets of 45–60-grain (2.9–3.9 g) to improve the terminal ballistics of the slower projectile. Conversely, these rounds may contain little more than a primer and an extra-light bullet.

Some shooters favor subsonic rounds for slightly improved accuracy and reduced noise. Supersonic rounds produce a loud crack which can scare away animals when hunting. Accuracy is reportedly improved with subsonic rounds because a supersonic bullet (or projectile) that slows from supersonic to subsonic speed undergoes drastic aerodynamic changes in this transonic zone that might adversely affect the stability and accuracy of the bullet.

Because the speed of sound in air at 68 °F (20 °C) is about 1,115 ft/s (340 m/s), the subsonic round's muzzle velocity is slightly below the speed of sound under many hunting conditions. However, under cold air conditions at 32 °F (0 °C), the speed of sound drops to 1,088 ft/s (332 m/s), approximately muzzle velocity. Hence, a "subsonic" round used below this temperature may be supersonic, and during the transition from supersonic to subsonic velocity, it may become unstable, reducing accuracy. To counteract this, some cartridge manufacturers have lowered the speed of their subsonic ammunition to 1,030 ft/s (310 m/s) or less.

Various combinations of subsonic rounds and semiautomatic .22 LR firearms result in unreliable action cycling due to insufficient recoil energy. Some subsonic rounds use heavier bullets (achieving lower velocities) to ensure, as a result of increased bullet mass, that enough energy is produced to cycle common blowback actions. As an example, the Aguila .22 LR SSS (sniper sub-sonic) round, has a 60 gr (3.9 g) bullet on a .22 short case, providing the cartridge the same overall dimensions as a .22 long rifle round. However, other problems may be encountered: the heavier, longer bullet of the Aguila cartridge requires a faster barrel twist (as determined by the Greenhill formula) to ensure the bullet remains stable in flight.

Two performance classes of .22 rimfire subsonic rounds exist. Some subsonic rounds, such as various .22 short and .22 long "CB" rounds, give about 700 ft/s (210 m/s) velocity with a 29 gr (1.9 g) bullet providing relatively low impact energy 30 ft⋅lbf (41 J) at the muzzle. These may not use any, or only small amounts of gunpowder, and have the characteristics of rounds intended only for indoor training or target practice rather than hunting. Where these are in .22 LR form, it is only to aid feeding in firearms designed for the cartridge, rather than older .22 CB shooting gallery rifles. The Aguila SSS has a velocity of 950 ft/s (290 m/s) using a 60 gr (3.9 g) bullet with 120 ft⋅lbf (160 J) of energy, which is equivalent to many high velocity .22 long rifle rounds using standard 40 gr (2.6 g) bullets. Other heavy-bullet subsonic rounds perform similarly and are intended for hunting small game or controlling dangerous animals while avoiding excessive noise.

=== Standard-velocity ===
Schlieren high-speed video of a .22 LR travelling in free-flight, demonstrating the air pressure dynamics surrounding the bullet

The velocity of standard-velocity .22 LR rounds varies between manufacturers. Some standard velocity ammo may be slightly supersonic-around 1,125 ft/s (343 m/s), other ammo such as CCI Standard Velocity .22 LR ammunition is rated at 1,070 ft/s (330 m/s). Most standard velocity ammo has a bullet weight of 40 gr (2.6 g). Standard-velocity cartridges generate near or slightly supersonic velocities. These rounds generally do not develop these velocities in handguns because their short barrels do not take full advantage of the slower burning powder.

=== High-velocity ===
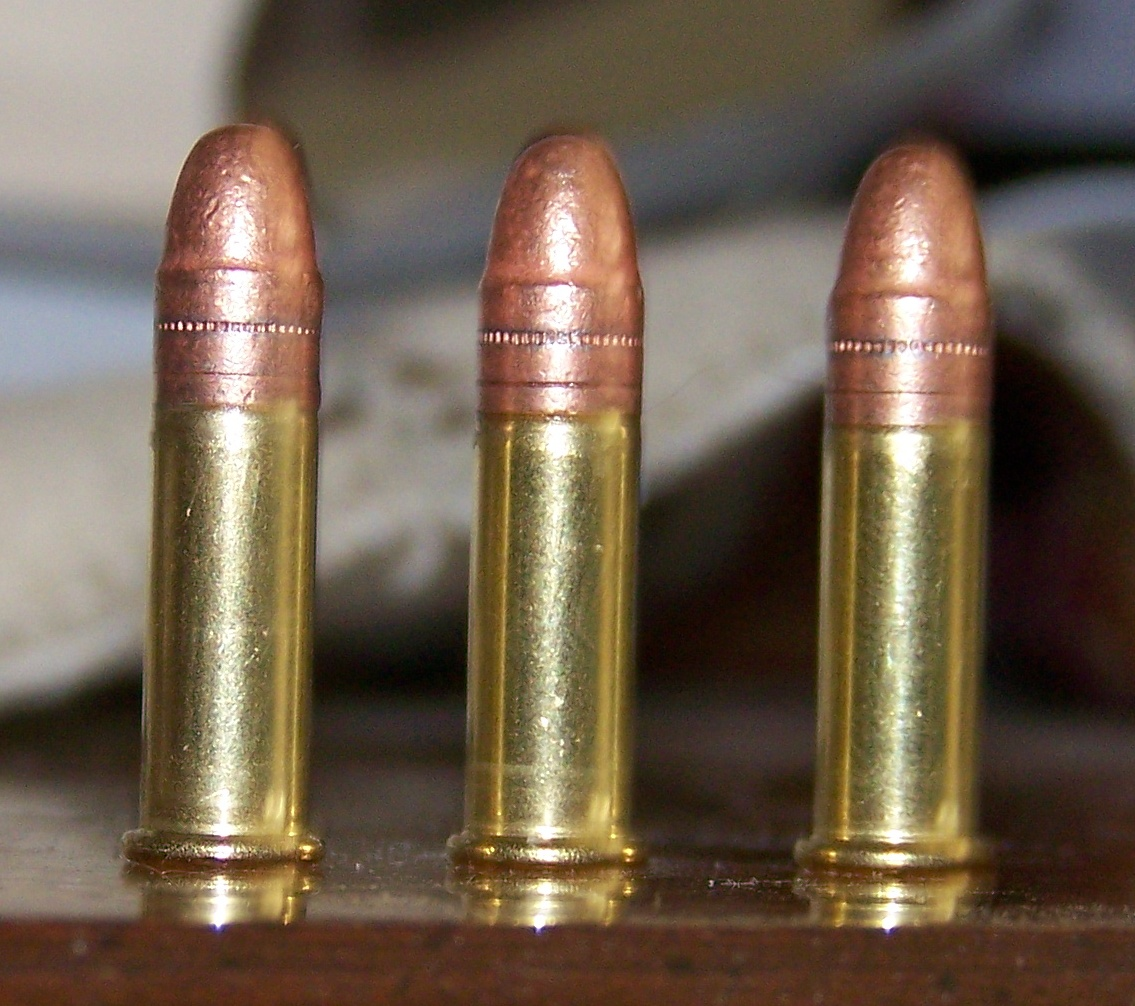
High-velocity, copper-plated .22 LR rounds

The .22 long rifle round was originally loaded with black powder. The first smokeless powder loads were intended to match the standard velocity of the original black-powder rounds. However, smokeless powder is more efficient than black powder, and the cartridge cases could hold more powder. Beginning in 1930, "high speed" or "high velocity" cartridges were offered by Remington and other ammunition manufacturers, giving a typical velocity increase of 8% (1,200 feet per second (370 m/s) to 1,300 feet per second (400 m/s)) while still using the standard 40 gr (2.6 g) solid or 36 gr (2.3 g) hollow-point lead bullet.

=== Hyper-velocity/Ultra-velocity ===
Many .22 LR cartridges use bullets lighter than the standard 40 gr (2.6 g) and are fired at even higher velocities. Hyper-velocity bullets usually weigh around 30 to 32 gr (1.9 to 2.1 g) and can have a muzzle velocity of 1,400 to 1,800 feet per second (430 to 550 m/s). This higher velocity is partially due to the use of lighter bullets.

The CCI Stinger was the first hyper-velocity .22 LR cartridge and provided a significant increase in velocity and energy over standard rimfire rounds. The .22 Long Rifle Stinger has a slightly longer case length at .702 in (17.8 mm) versus .613 in (15.6 mm) for the standard case length of the .22 Long Rifle cartridge, but the plated hollow point bullet is lighter and shorter at 30–32 gr (1.9–2.1 g), both of these cartridges use the same overall cartridge length of 1.00 in (25 mm). This slightly longer case length can cause feeding and ejection issues in some match grade guns. A powder with a slower burning rate is used to make the most use of the length of a rifle barrel. Most .22 long rifle powders increase velocity up to about 19 in (480 mm) of the barrel. The powder used in the .22 Long Rifle Stinger increased the velocity in the longest .22 caliber barrel length that is used in testing by the NRA, which is 24 in (610 mm).

Later on, other makers introduced hyper-velocity rounds based on the long rifle case, with lighter bullets in the 30 gr (1.9 g) weight range and slow-burning rifle powder loads. The overall length of many of these cartridges was less than the overall length of the standard 40 gr (2.6 g) long rifle cartridge. One example is the Remington Viper and another is the Federal Spitfire.

The CCI Velocitor hyper-velocity round uses the standard long rifle case size and a standard-weight 40 gr (2.6 g) bullet with a proprietary hollow-point design to enhance expansion and trauma. This cartridge has a muzzle velocity of 1,435 ft/s (437 m/s) and matches the overall length of the standard long rifle cartridge.

=== Shot cartridges ===
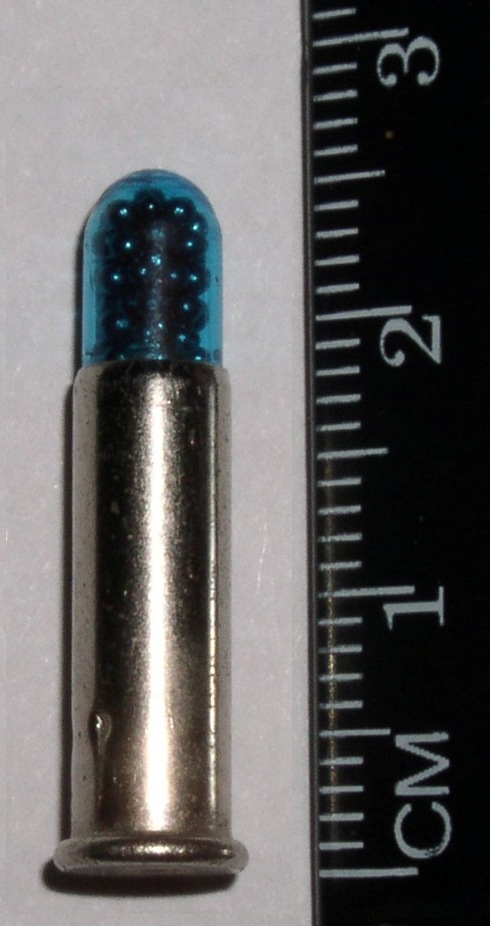
.22 snake shot with shot capsule

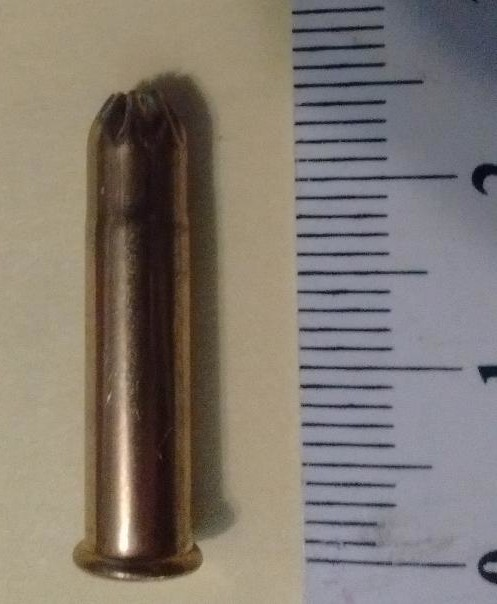
Federal .22 LR bird shot with full length crimped case

Special .22LR caliber shot cartridges, usually loaded with No. 12 shot, have also been made. These are often called "snake shot," "bird shot", and "rat-shot" due to their use in very short range pest control. Such rounds have either a longer brass case that is crimped closed or a translucent plastic "bullet" that contains the shot and shatters upon firing.

=== Full metal jacket ===
During World War II, a full metal jacket bullet version of the .22 LR was developed as the T-42 for the suppressed High Standard HDM pistol. The US Army Air Corps procured the Savage Model 24 .22 LR/.410 combination gun as an air crew survival weapon included in the E series of survival and sustenance kits, primarily to forage for game for food. The .22 LR full metal jacket bullet ammunition was issued with these firearms for military use to comply with treaty restrictions on expanding bullets. The 1961 Army and Air Force technical manual for small-arms ammunition lists the jacketed cartridge as the M24.

=== Tracer ===
Tracer ammunition is also available in .22 long rifle rimfire.

== Cartridge construction ==
The traditional .22 rimfire cartridges (BB, CB, short, long, long rifle, and extra long) differ in construction from more modern cartridges in the way the bullet is constructed and held in the case. Bullets for traditional .22 rimfires are the same outside diameter as the case but are constructed with a narrower cupped "heel" on the base of the bullet, which is inserted into the case. The case mouth is then crimped around the bullet's heel, leaving most of the bullet-bearing surface exposed to contact the barrel of the gun. The bearing surface of .22 rimfire bullets is often lubricated and exposed to contamination. This was a common design in the early black powder cartridge era.

In later cartridges, including the .22 Winchester Rimfire and .22 Winchester Magnum Rimfire rimfire and modern centerfire cartridges, the bullet body is a uniform diameter and the bearing surface is inserted completely within the neck of the cartridge case, held in place by tension from the case neck around the bullet bearing surface (in some cartridges the case mouth may also be crimped into a cannelure (groove) in the bullet). The heeled bullet cartridge is considered weaker than the uniform diameter bullet cartridge, which encloses the bearing surface of the bullet within the cartridge neck. The overall reliability of heeled-bullet rimfire ammunition is high but lower than that of most centerfire ammunition.

== Cartridge length ==
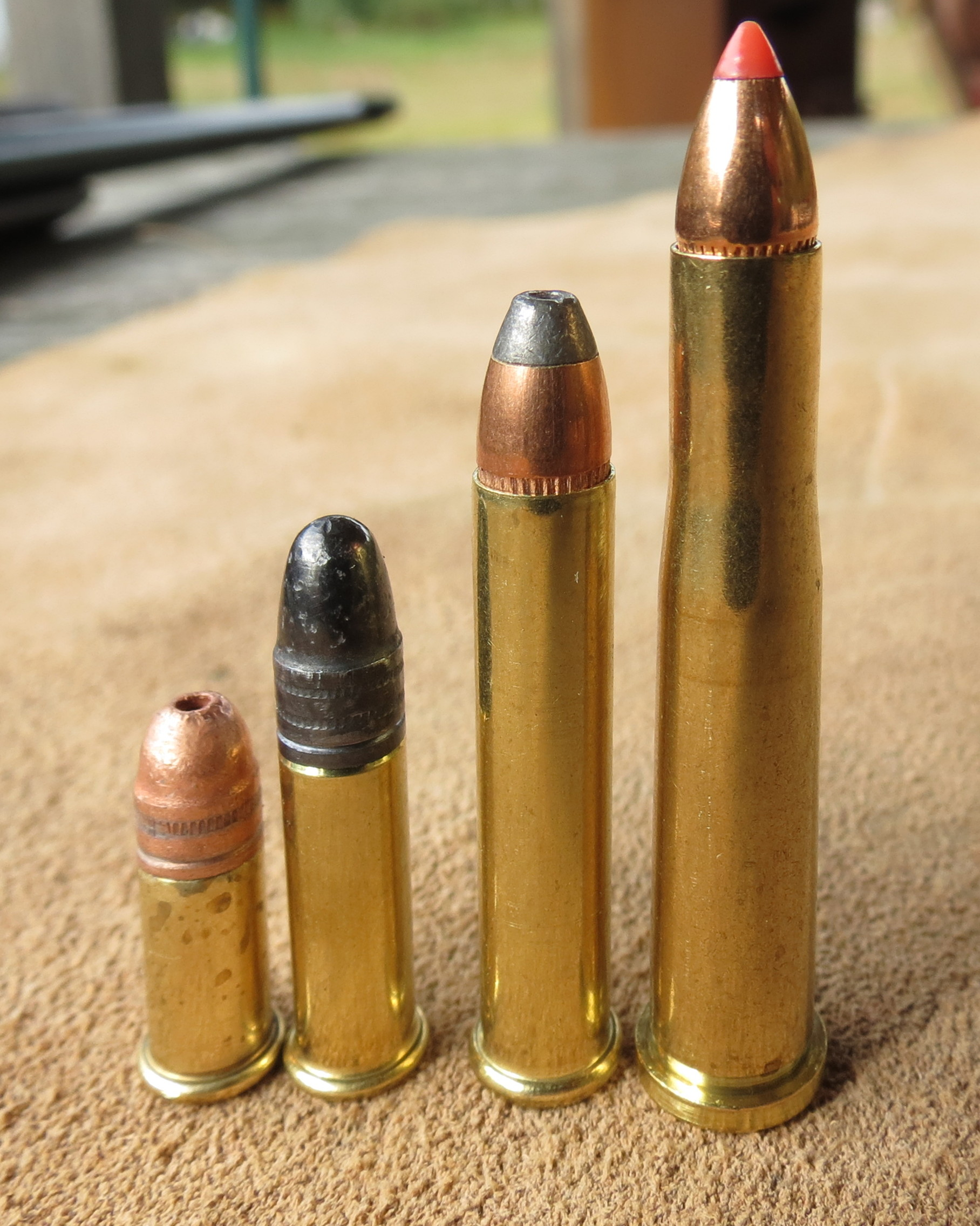
A .22 Short, .22 long rifle, .22 Winchester Magnum, and a .22 Hornet

The .22 long rifle uses a straight-walled case. Depending on the type and feed mechanism employed, a firearm chambered for .22 long rifle may also be able to safely chamber and fire shorter rimfire cartridges, including the .22 BB, .22 CB, .22 short, .22 long. The .22 long rifle may also be used in firearms chambered for the obsolete .22 extra long.

== Usage ==
Today, rimfire rounds are mainly used for hunting small pests, for sports shooting, for plinking, and for inexpensive training. The .22LR is the choice for several shooting events: biathlon, bullseye, plus divisions of benchrest shooting, metallic silhouette and pin shooting, most high school, collegiate, Boy Scouts of America, Project Appleseed, 4H shooting events, and many others. It is also used in the precision Rifle and Pistol shooting events at the Olympic Games. Good quality rimfire ammunition can be quite accurate. The main advantages are low cost, low recoil, low noise, and high accuracy-to-cost ratio. The main disadvantage is its low power; it is better suited for use on small game and other small animals.

As a defensive cartridge, it is considered inadequate by many, though the small size allows very lightweight, easily concealable handguns which can be carried in circumstances where anything larger would be impractical. Despite their limitations, people can use .22 LR pistols and rifles for defense, and they are common simply because they are prevalent, inexpensive, and widely available.

Most semiautomatic rifles firing .22 LR cartridges will often only work properly with standard or high-velocity rimfire ammunition, as the low recoil of subsonic rounds is insufficient to cycle the weapon's action. Rifles with manual actions do not have this problem. Due to the low bolt thrust of the .22 LR cartridge, most self-loading firearms chambered for the cartridge use the direct blowback operation system.

The tiny case of the .22 LR and the subsonic velocities (when using subsonic ammunition) make it well-suited for use with a firearm suppressor (also known as silencers or sound moderators). The low volume of powder gases means that .22 LR suppressors are often no larger than a bull barrel; the Ruger 10/22 and Ruger MK II are common choices, because of their reliability and low cost, and the resulting product is often nearly indistinguishable from a bull barrel model (although weighing far less). Where firearm suppressors are only minimally restricted, a .22 LR firearm with a suppressor is often favored for plinking, as it does not require hearing protection or cause noise pollution. Local government agencies sometimes use suppressed rimfire weapons for animal control, since dangerous animals or pests can be dispatched in populated areas without causing undue alarm.

The .22 LR has also seen limited usage by police and military snipers. Its main advantage in this role is its low noise, but it is usually limited to urban operations because of its short range. One study suggests that a single head/torso shot suffices, more often than not.

The Israeli military used a suppressed .22 LR rifle in the 1990s for riot control and to "eliminate disturbing dogs prior to operations"; however, it is now used less often as it is more lethal than previously suspected. Some other examples include the use of suppressed High Standard HDM pistols by the American OSS, which was the predecessor organization of the CIA. Francis Gary Powers was issued a suppressed High Standard for the flight in which he was shot down. Suppressed Ruger MK II pistols were used by the US Navy SEALs in the 1990s.

== Cartridge dimensions ==
.22 long rifle cartridge dimensions in inches

.22 long rifle maximum C.I.P. cartridge dimensions. All sizes in millimetres (mm).

The common rifling twist rate for this cartridge is 406mm (1:16 in), six grooves, land width = 2.16mm, Ø lands = 5.38mm, Ø grooves = 5.58mm.

According to the official C.I.P. (Commission Internationale Permanente pour l'Epreuve des Armes à Feu Portatives) rulings, the .22 long rifle can handle up to 170.00 MPa (24,656 psi) P_{max} piezo pressure. In C.I.P. regulated countries, every rifle cartridge combo has to be proofed at 125% of this maximum C.I.P. pressure to certify for sale to consumers.

Because the .22 long rifle round commonly uses a heeled lead or lightly plated bullet, the nominal bullet diameter is larger than the nominal bore diameter. Lead bullets with a diameter equal to or slightly smaller than the barrel's groove diameter may allow exhaust gases to pass, leading to excessive lead fouling. SAAMI specifies a nominal bullet diameter of 0.2255 with a tolerance of -0.004, while the specified bore diameter is 0.222. In practice, 0.224 or slightly larger bullets are common, with barrel groove diameters commonly around 0.223.

== Muzzle velocity (nominal) ==
- 40-grain (2.6 g) lead:1,082 ft/s (330 m/s) .22 LR standard velocity
- 40-grain (2.6 g) copper plated lead:1,260 ft/s (380 m/s) .22 LR high velocity
- 36-grain (2.3 g) copper plated lead: 1,328 ft/s (405 m/s) .22 LR hollow point high velocity
- 32-grain (2.1 g) copper plated lead: 1,640 ft/s (500 m/s) .22 LR hyper-velocity CCI Stinger

Note: actual velocities depend on many factors, such as the barrel length of a given firearm and the manufacturer of a given batch of ammunition, and will vary widely in practice. The above velocities are typical.

== See also ==
- .22 BB
- .22 CB
- .22 short
- .22 long
- .22 extra long
- .22 magnum
- .22 Hornet
- .25 ACP
- .220 Rook
- 5 mm caliber
- .17 HMR
- .17 HM2
- Cadet rifle
- List of rimfire cartridges
- Table of handgun and rifle cartridges
