= .22 long =

Variety of rimfire 22 caliber ammunition

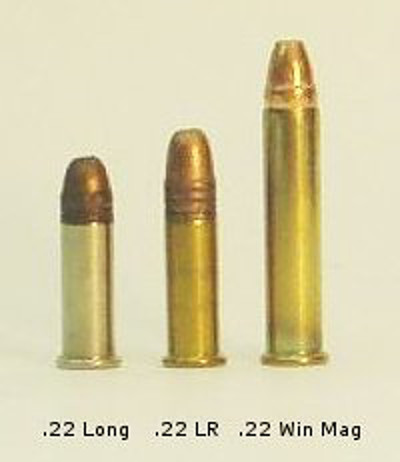
- .22 long (left), .22 long rifle (middle), .22 Winchester Magnum Rimfire (right)
- Type: Rifle
- Place of origin: United States

Production history
- Produced: 1871–present

Specifications
- Parent case: .22 short
- Case type: Rimmed, straight
- Bullet diameter: .222 in (5.6 mm)
- Neck diameter: .226 in (5.7 mm)
- Base diameter: .226 in (5.7 mm)
- Rim diameter: .278 in (7.1 mm)
- Rim thickness: .043 in (1.1 mm)
- Case length: .613 in (15.6 mm)
- Overall length: .888 in (22.6 mm)
- Rifling twist: 1-16"
- Primer type: Rimfire
- Maximum pressure: 24,000 psi (170 MPa)

Ballistic performance
Bullet mass/type	Velocity	Energy
29 gr (2 g) RN	1,038 ft/s (316 m/s)	67 ft⋅lbf (91 J)
- Source: Cartridges of the World

The .22 long is a variety of .22 caliber (5.6 mm) rimfire ammunition. The .22 long is the second-oldest of the surviving rimfire cartridges, dating back to 1871, when it was loaded with a 29 gr (1.9 g) bullet and 5 gr (0.32 g) of black powder, 25% more than the .22 short on which it was based. It was designed for use in revolvers, but was soon chambered in rifles as well, in which it gained a reputation as a small game cartridge.

In 1887, the .22 long case was combined with the heavier 40 gr (2.6 g) bullet of the .22 extra long of 1880 to produce the .22 long rifle, giving a longer overall length and a higher muzzle energy. Many firearms designed for the .22 long rifle will chamber and fire the shorter round, though the .22 long generally does not generate sufficient energy to operate semi-automatic guns. The one prominent survivor of the .22 long is the .22 CB long, a long-cased version of the .22 CB.

The original .22 long loading used the same powder charge as the .22 long rifle, .22 long bullet was significantly lighter, but it did not result in higher velocities for the .22 long when fired from a rifle. The large barrel volume to chamber volume ratio of a .22 rimfire rifle means that the powder gasses have expanded as far as they can before the bullet reaches the muzzle of a normal-length rifle barrel, and the light .22 long bullet has less inertia than the .22 long rifle. The quieter report and lower penetration of the .22 long cartridge were often seen as desirable qualities.

The .22 long rifle performs as well in a short handgun barrel as the .22 long, and outperforms it in a long rifle barrel.

Modern Hypervelocity loadings of the .22 long rifle use bullets as light as 30 gr (1.9 g), and modern blends of powder to generate velocities higher than normal loads, and chamber pressures high enough to cycle semi-automatic firearms reliably. The most well known of these is the CCI Stinger, which goes so far as to stretch the case length slightly. The overall length is still within the max overall length for the .22 long rifle.

The .22 long is still produced even after the change over to smokeless powders. CCI currently loads a high-velocity .22 long with a muzzle velocity of 1,215 ft/s (370 m/s) and a muzzle energy of 95 ft⋅lbf (129 J)

== Specifications ==
- Length:
  - Case: 0.613 in (15.6 mm)
  - Overall: 0.888 in (22.6 mm)
- Bullet weight: 29 gr (1.88 g)
  - Twist: 1 in 20 for dedicated firearms

== See also ==
- .22 BB
- .22 CB
- .22 short
- .22 extra long
- .22 long rifle
- .22 magnum
- .22 Hornet
- 5 mm caliber
- List of rifle cartridges
- List of rimfire cartridges
