= .22 short =

Variety of rimfire .22 caliber ammunition

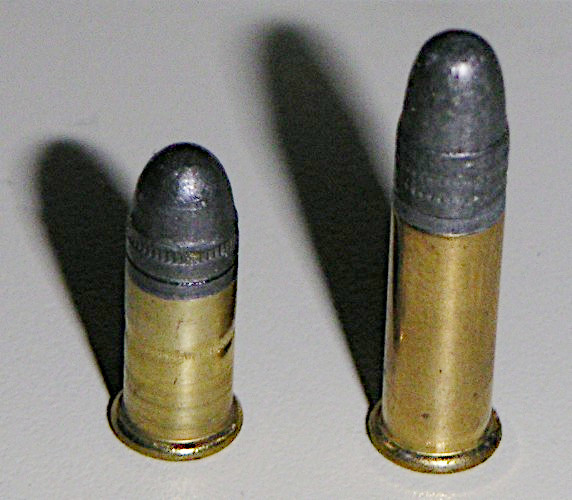
- .22 short, left; .22 long rifle, right
- Type: Pistol
- Place of origin: United States

Production history
- Manufacturer: Smith & Wesson
- Produced: 1857–present

Specifications
- Case type: Rimmed, straight
- Bullet diameter: .222 in (5.6 mm)
- Neck diameter: .226 in (5.7 mm)
- Base diameter: .226 in (5.7 mm)
- Rim diameter: .278 in (7.1 mm)
- Rim thickness: .043 in (1.1 mm)
- Case length: .421 in (10.7 mm)
- Overall length: .695 in (17.7 mm)
- Rifling twist: 1-20" or 1-24"
- Primer type: Rimfire
- Maximum pressure: 21,000 psi (140 MPa)

Ballistic performance
Bullet mass/type	Velocity	Energy
27 gr. (1.8 g) RN	1,164 ft/s (355 m/s)	87 ft⋅lbf (118 J)
29 gr. (1.9 g) RN	830 ft/s (250 m/s)	44 ft⋅lbf (60 J)
29 gr. (1.9 g) RN	1,132 ft/s (345 m/s)	82 ft⋅lbf (111 J)

.22 short is a variety of .22 caliber rimfire ammunition. Developed in 1857 for the first Smith & Wesson revolver, the .22 rimfire was the first American metallic cartridge. The original loading was a 29 or 30 gr (0.066 or 0.069 oz; 1.879 or 1.944 g) bullet and 4 gr (0.0091 oz; 0.2592 g) of black powder. The original .22 rimfire cartridge was renamed .22 short with the introduction of the .22 long in 1871.

Developed for self defense, the modern .22 short, though still used in a few pocket pistols and mini-revolvers, is mainly used as a quiet round for practice by the recreational shooter. The .22 short was popularly used in shooting galleries at fairs and arcades; several rifle makers produced "gallery" models for .22 short exclusively. Due to its low recoil and good inherent accuracy, the .22 short was used for the Olympic 25 meter rapid fire pistol event until 2004, and it was allowed in the shooting part of modern pentathlon competitions before they switched to air pistols.

Several makes of starter pistols use .22 short blank cartridges. Some powder-actuated nail guns use .22 short blanks as a power source.

== Overview ==
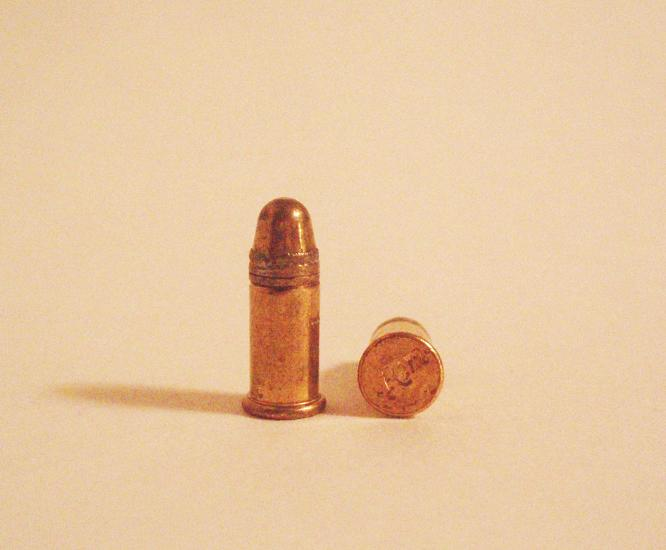
A .22 short cartridge

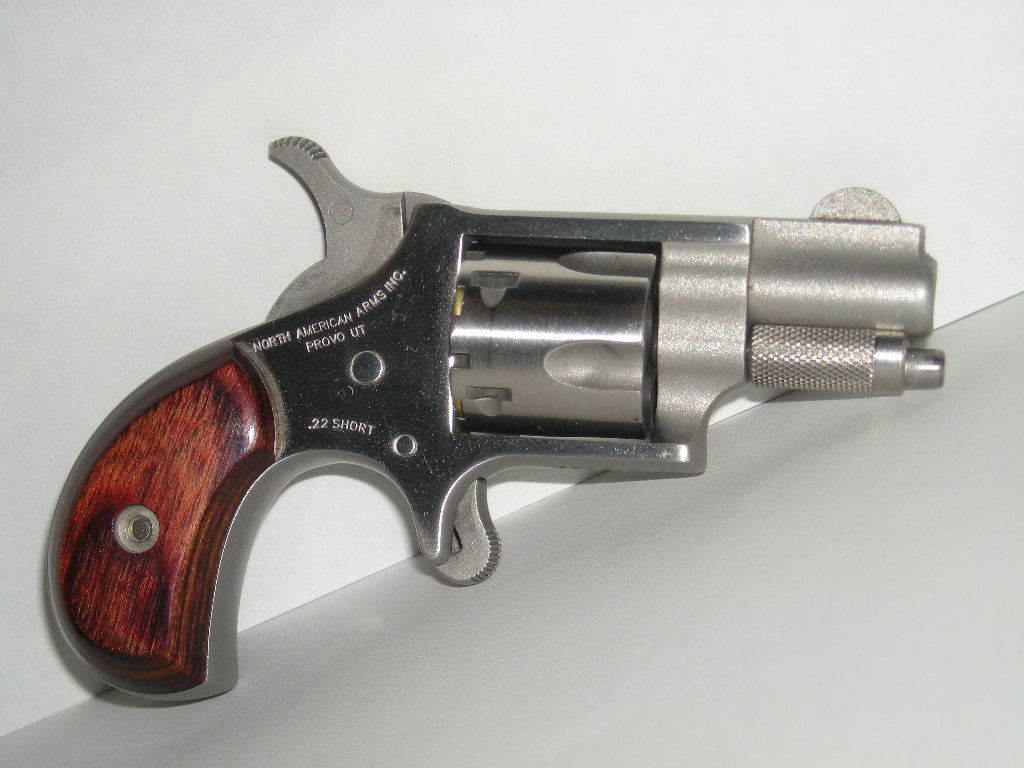
North American Arms model NAA22S mini-revolver, chambered in .22 short

Most .22 short bullets are made of lead (usually coated with grease or wax, or copper) in round nose or hollow point styles. Bullets for use at shooting galleries were often made of compressed powdered metal that disintegrated on impact to avoid ricochets and over-penetration of backstops. The standard velocity .22 short launches a 29-grain (1.9 g) bullet at 1,045 feet per second (319 m/s) with 70 ft·lbf (95 J) of energy from a 22 in (559 mm) rifle barrel and can penetrate 2 inches (51 mm) of soft pine.

As a hunting round, the high velocity hollow point Short is useful only for small game such as tree squirrels and rabbits. For small game hunting in general, the greater energy and wider ammunition selection of the .22 long rifle make it a more popular choice. In the American South, the .22 short hollow point is still very popular for use on raccoons, which are treed at night using dogs and shooting is at close range. In some states, the .22 short is the only legal round to use for such hunting.

Although the .22 long rifle has surpassed the .22 short in the marketplace, many ammunition companies still produce .22 shorts, and in a fairly wide variety. Most makers utilize the standard 29-grain (1.9 g) solid round nose bullet and 27-grain (1.7 g) hollow point bullet weights for the .22 short. Several types are made by CCI: a CB Short at 727 ft/s (222 m/s), target Shorts at 830 ft/s (250 m/s), their standard Short round with plated round nose bullet at 1,080 ft/s (330 m/s), and a high speed hunting load with plated hollow point bullet at 1,105 ft/s (337 m/s). The .22 short high-velocity exceeds the performance of the .22 long (with the exception of CCI's High Velocity 1217fps long loading), and the .22 short has displaced the .22 long as an alternate to the .22 long rifle for many .22 shooters. Fiocchi makes their Exacta Compensated Super Match SM200 with lead round nose at 650 ft/s (200 m/s). Remington produces a high velocity plated round nose at 1,095 ft/s (334 m/s). Aguila makes both a match lead round nose at 1,095 ft/s (334 m/s), and a "high speed" round with plated bullet also listed at 1,095 ft/s (334 m/s). Also available is the RWS R25 match ammunition at 560 ft/s (170 m/s). Eley also makes their rapid fire match cartridge at 750 ft/s (230 m/s).

Most of the target oriented and CB Shorts are very quiet, due to being subsonic. When fired from a full-length rifle barrel, most .22 short loadings are as quiet as if not quieter than, the average air rifle.

The Aguila SubSonic Sniper (SSS) round uses a .22 short case length with a 60-grain (3.9 g) bullet (twice the weight of the .22 short bullet and 50% heavier than a .22 long rifle bullet) giving an overall length of a .22 long rifle round, this made categorizing the SubSonic Sniper problematic: while the SSS case length is the same as the .22 short case, the firing chamber of the barrel uses the longer .22 LR dimensions to be able to accept the SubSonic Sniper cartridge.

=== .22 short-caliber rifles ===
There have been many rifles chambered for the .22 short over the years, but only several lever action rifles are currently chambered for this round, notably Henry Repeating Arms and Marlin Firearms Co. lever action rifles. The Marlin Golden 39A model represents the oldest and longest continuously produced shoulder firearm in the world. Many rifles in .22 short were made between 1901 and 1940, mostly intended for gallery shooting and small game hunting. Remington and Winchester produced the most rifles in .22 short. Remington has made their Model 24 and Model 241 "Speedmaster" semi-autos as well as their Model 12 and 121 "Fieldmaster" pump actions in .22 short. Remington's Nylon 66 GS Gallery Special (1962 to 1981) was one of the last .22 short-only rifles made especially for shooting gallery use. Winchester produced a variety of different rifles in .22 short, including the 1873 lever action, 1885 single shot (in both low wall and high wall variations), Model 1890, 1906 and 62A pump actions, Model 74 semi-auto, and Model 61 pump action. Many of their bolt-action rifles were available on a special-order basis in .22 short. Browning/FN also produced their takedown semi-auto in .22 short, on the same John Browning design upon which the Remington Model 24 is based.

Many of these rifles are now collector's items, particularly the Winchesters, and demand a premium in price over the same rifle chambered in .22 long rifle.

Many rifles marked ".22 short, long and long rifle" (or ".22 S, L, LR") will not shoot shorts with the same accuracy as they will a long rifle round nor as accurately as a rifle designed for .22 short. This is due to the excess chamber length needed to allow chambering of .22 LR cartridges. This requires the bullet from a .22 short to travel a short distance before it engages the rifling, which is detrimental to accuracy. In addition, barrels made for .22 short are rifled with a rate of twist of one turn in twenty inches, while barrels made for .22 long rifle have a twist of one turn in sixteen inches.

== See also ==
- .22 BB
- .22 CB
- .22 long
- .22 extra long
- .22 long rifle
- .22 magnum
- .22 Hornet
- List of rifle cartridges
- List of rimfire cartridges
- 5 mm caliber—Other cartridges of similar size.
- Table of handgun and rifle cartridges
