= Physical pest control =

Physical pest control is a method of getting rid of insects and small rodents by killing, removing, or setting up barriers that will prevent further destruction of one's plants. These methods are used primarily for crop growing, but some methods can be applied to homes as well.

== Methods ==
=== Barriers ===
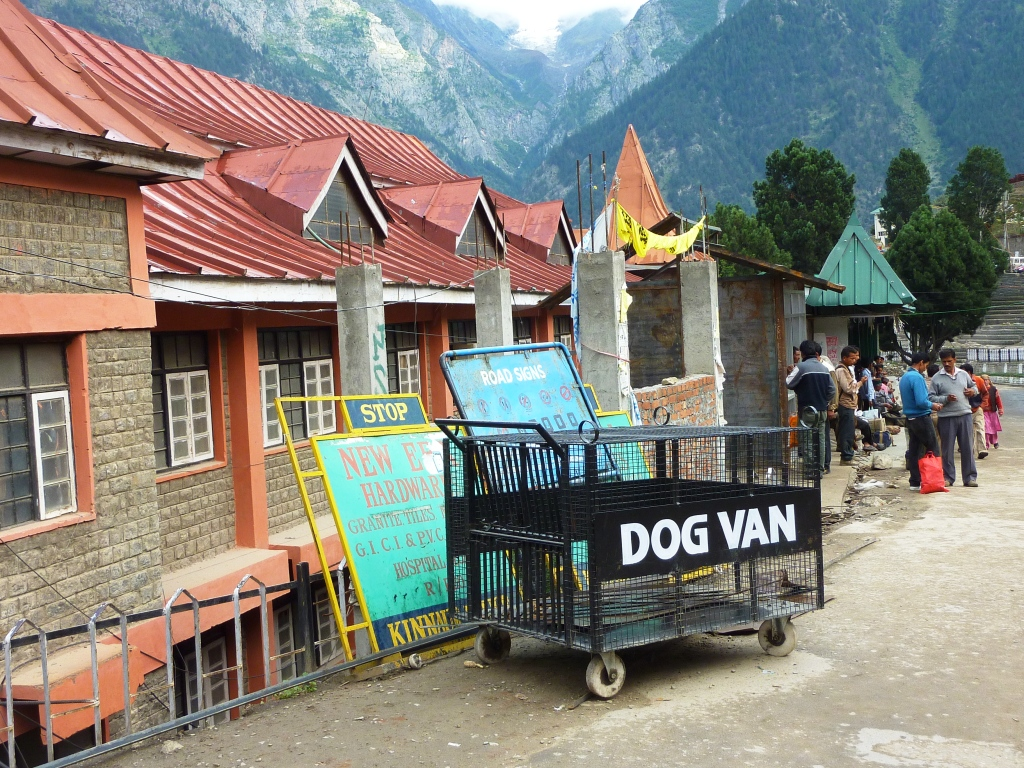
Dog control van, Rekong Peo, Himachal Pradesh, India

Row covers are useful for keeping insects out of one's plants, typically used for horticultural crops. They are made out of either plastic or polyester. They are made thin and light to allow plants to still absorb sunshine and water from the air.

Diatomaceous earth, made from fossilized and pulverized silica shells, can be used in order to damage the protective cuticle layer of insects that have them, such as ants. When this layer is damaged, the insects become vulnerable to drying out. Unfortunately, the effectiveness of Diatomaceous earth decreases if it is wet. Therefore, it must be used often. This method was used back in the 1930s and 1940s when farmers would run dust over their fields. This would have the very same effect as diatomaceous earth.

=== Fire ===
For farmers, fire has been a powerful technique used to destroy insect breeding grounds. It is used to burn the top of the soil in order to kill the insects that lie there. Unfortunately, this can present some drawbacks. Fire can make the soil much less effective or get rid of the insects that are beneficial to the plants. Also, there is no guarantee that it will actually solve the pest problems since there may be larvae below the surface of the soil.

=== Firearms ===
Historically, firearms have been one of the primary methods used for pest control. "Garden Guns" are smooth bore shotguns specifically made to fire .22 caliber snake shot or 9mm Flobert, and are commonly used by gardeners and farmers for pest control. Garden Guns are short range weapons that can do little harm past 15 to 20 yards, and they're relatively quiet when fired with snake shot, compared to a standard ammunition. These guns are especially effective inside of barns and sheds, as the snake shot will not shoot holes in the roof or walls, or more importantly injure livestock with a ricochet. They are also used for pest control at airports, warehouses, stockyards, etc.

The most common shot cartridge is .22 Long Rifle loaded with #12 shot. At a distance of about 10 feet (3 m), which is about the maximum effective range, the pattern is about 8 inches (20 cm) in diameter from a standard rifle. Special smoothbore shotguns, such as the Marlin Model 25MG can produce effective patterns out to 15 or 20 yards using .22 WMR shotshells, which hold 1/8 oz. of #12 shot contained in a plastic capsule.

=== Animals ===
Dogs, cats, ferrets, mongoose and other animals have been historically used for pest control. The Rat Terrier is an American dog breed with a background as a farm dog and hunting companion. Specifically bred for killing rats, today's Rat Terrier is an intelligent and active small dog that is kept both for pest control and as a family pet. Cats are also valued for companionship and for their ability to hunt vermin. Ferrets are used for hunting, or ferreting. With their long, lean build, and inquisitive nature, ferrets are very well equipped for getting down holes and chasing rodents, rabbits and moles out of their burrows. Mongooses have long been celebrated for their ability to handle venomous snakes, as immortalized in the short story Rikki-Tikki-Tavi.

=== Temperature control ===
Placing produce inside of cold storage containers lengthens how long the produce lasts while also hindering the growth of insects inside of them. Another method to use is to heat, as it will kill the insect larvae in certain types of produce. An example would be with mangoes, where they are placed into a hot water bath in order to kill any eggs and larvae.

=== Traps ===
Fly paper or sticky boards are devices used in order to capture insects as they land upon the surface of the trap. They are covered in a substance that attracts insects, but are actually very sticky or poisonous. These traps are commonly used for flies or leafhoppers.

Trap strips are crops that are grown on fields with the intention of using them to attract insects and not have insects infest the other crops that are being grown. The insects can then be dealt with much more easily than if they were to have been spread throughout an entire field. Trap strips are very useful for dealing with the wheat stem sawfly. The sawflies will go only as far as they need to in order to plant their eggs. If solid stemmed plants are planted around the a crop field, then that's where the sawflies will go and the sawflies’ larvae can't survive in the solid stem.

== Large scale usage ==
On a much larger scale, physical control methods become much less effective because of the time that must be invested into it and because it is likely to be less economical. For example, taking care of a single tree is simple, but taking care of 500, like on a farm, would be impossible using physical control.

== See also ==
- Pest control
- Biological pest control
- Garden guns
- Mechanical pest control
