= Snake Charmer (shotgun) =

.410 bore, single-shot, break-action shotgun

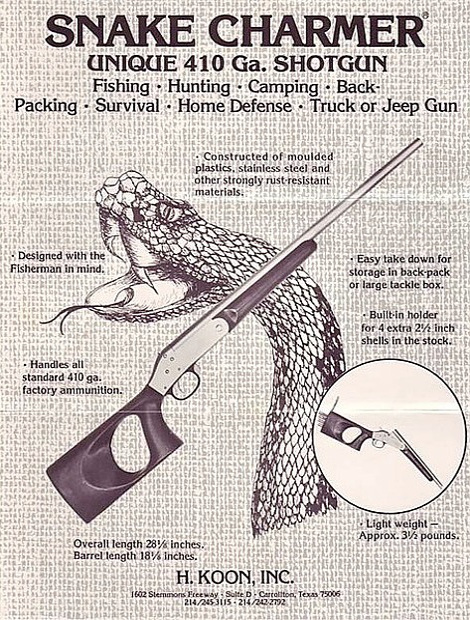
- H. Koon "Snake Charmer" advertisement
- Type: Shotgun
- Place of origin: United States

Production history
- Designer: Homer Koon
- Designed: 1970s
- Manufacturer: H.Koon, Inc; Sporting Arms Mfg; V.B.E Inc; Verney-Carron
- Produced: 1978 to 2009
- Variants: Snake Charmer II; Night Charmer; Field Gun

Specifications
- Mass: 3 1/2 lb (1.59 kg)
- Length: 28 1/8 in (714.38 mm)
- Barrel length: 18 1/8 in (460.38 mm)
- Cartridge: .410 bore
- Action: break-action
- Feed system: single-shot
- Sights: none

The Snake Charmer is a .410 bore, stainless steel, single-shot, break-action shotgun, with an exposed hammer, an 18-1/8" barrel, black molded plastic stock and forend (aka "furniture"), and a short thumb-hole butt-stock that holds four additional 2-1/2" shotgun shells. These lightweight 3-1/2 pound guns have an overall length of 28-1/8 inches and will easily fit on the saddle of a horse. They may also be easily disassembled for "storage in a back-pack or large tackle box". They are commonly used by gardeners and farmers for pest control. The term "Snake Charmer" would go on to become synonymous with any small, short-barreled, single-shot, .410 shotgun.

== History ==
The Snake Charmer was introduced in 1978, by H.Koon, Inc., of Dallas, Texas. It originally sold for $89.95 and was marketed as a general-purpose utility shotgun perfect for "Fishing - Hunting - Camping - Back Packing - Survival - Home Defense - Truck or Jeep Gun".

Koons would sell the company to Sporting Arms Mfg, of Littlefield, Texas. They added a manual safety switch which blocked the hammer when engaged and re-branded it as the Snake Charmer II. Sporting Arms would introduce the Night Charmer (disc. 1988) which featured a flashlight built into the fore-stock. This flashlight equipped fore-stock was also available as an option and sold separately. Sporting Arms would also introduce a larger version, the Field Gun, which featured a full length stock and a 24-inch barrel.

The design was later sold to V.B.E, Inc, of Clay Center, Kansas. They were then later made by Verney-Carron. Imported models would have the importer (Kebco LLC) marked on them.

== Other versions ==
Snake Charmer or Snake Tamer type shotguns are also made by Rossi as well as Harrington & Richardson.

The Rossi Tuffy is a single-shot .410 bore shotgun. It features half-length thumb-hole polymer stock that holds four additional shot-shells and strongly resembles the original Snake Charmer. Unlike its predecessor, it has ejectors that automatically expel spent shells.

The H&R Snake Tamer is also a Snake Charmer like shotgun. Available in 20-gauge or .410-bore/.45 Colt only. These single-shot guns have either a blued finish or an electroless nickel finish with a full-length thumb-hole polymer stock. The right side of the stock is open with storage for three 20-gauge or four .410-bore shotgun shells. It also has ejectors that automatically expel spent shells.

== See also ==
- Garden guns – Type of small bore shotguns commonly used by gardeners and farmers for pest control
- Kit gun – Multi-purpose utility handguns
- Snake shot – Handgun and rifle cartridge loaded with lead shot
