= Smith & Wesson Model 34 Kit Gun =

Smith and Wesson Model 34 Kit Gun
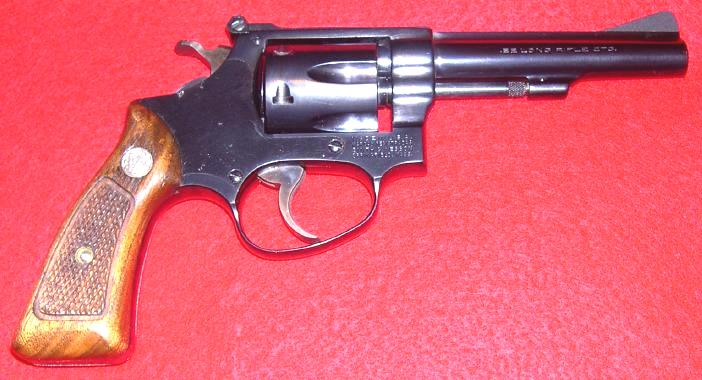
- Smith and Wesson Model 34-1
- Type: Revolver, Kit gun
- Place of origin: United States

Production history
- Manufacturer: Smith and Wesson
- Produced: 1958–1991
- Variants: Model 43, Model 51, Model 63, Model 317

Specifications
- Barrel length: 4 inch
- Cartridge: .22 Long Rifle
- Action: Double-action
- Feed system: 6 shot
- Sights: Target sights

The Smith & Wesson Model 34 Kit Gun is a small, six-shot, .22 Long Rifle, double-action revolver made by Smith & Wesson. It came with a two-inch or four-inch barrel and has adjustable-sights. It was designed to be easily packed in a hunting or fishing "kit" for small game hunting, plinking, pest control and self defense.

== History ==
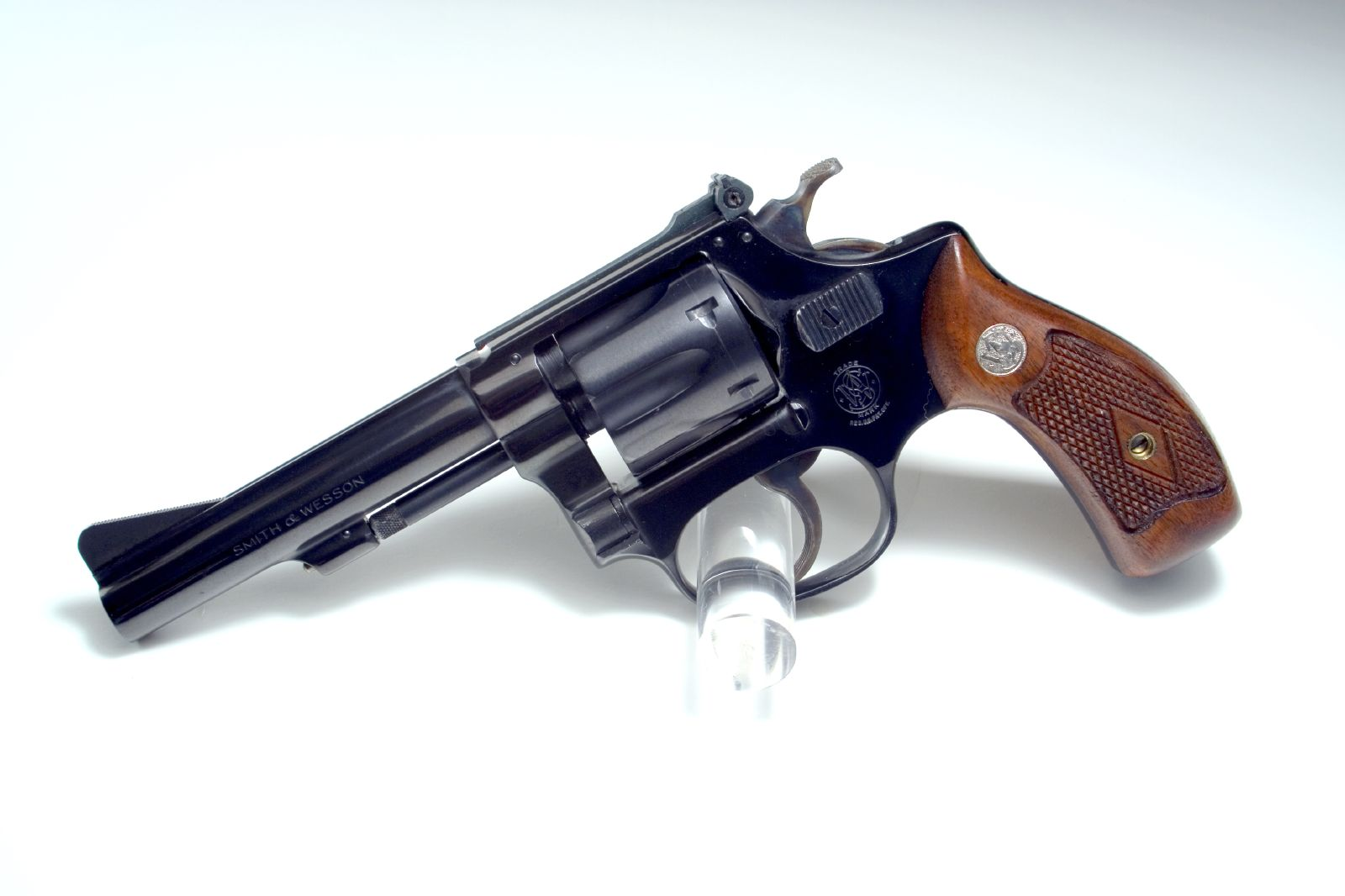
Smith and Wesson Model 22/32 Kit Gun

In 1911, the Kit Gun line began as the 22/32 an I-Frame, .22LR, six-shot revolver. These are sometimes called the "pre-war" models. In 1953, an improved model was introduced, the "22/32 Kit Gun, Model of 1953”. In 1958, Smith and Wesson renamed it the Model 34. This production line continued until 1960, when it was redesigned using the slightly larger J-frame and marketed as the model 34–1. The Model 34 continued to be manufactured until 1991.

The Smith & Wesson Target Model 1953 (AKA: Model 35) is a six inch barrel .22LR target revolver also based on the 22/32 model. The rear sight was adjustable for both elevation and windage, the front sight had a distinctive T-shaped blade. Manufacture began in 1953, and it was discontinued in 1974.

In 1955, the Model 43 Airweight with an aluminum alloy frame was introduced. In 1960, a .22 Winchester Magnum Rimfire version, the Model 51, was introduced. The Model 43 and 51 were discontinued in 1974. A stainless steel version, the Model 63 Kit Gun, was released in 1977. In 1983, the stainless steel Model 650 in .22 WMR was introduced. The six-shot Model 63 was replaced by an eight-shot version in 1997.

In 1997, Smith & Wesson also introduced the new eight-shot Model 317 AirLite Kit Gun, and the later the .38 Special Model 337 AirLite Kit Gun, and a .44 Special Model 396 AirLite Mountain Lite Kit Gun. All are made of aluminum alloy frames and cylinders made of titanium (except the Model 317, whose cylinder is aluminum). Their aluminum barrels have a stainless steel liner.

== See also ==
- Kit gun
