= Kaolin spray =

Kaolin-based pest control

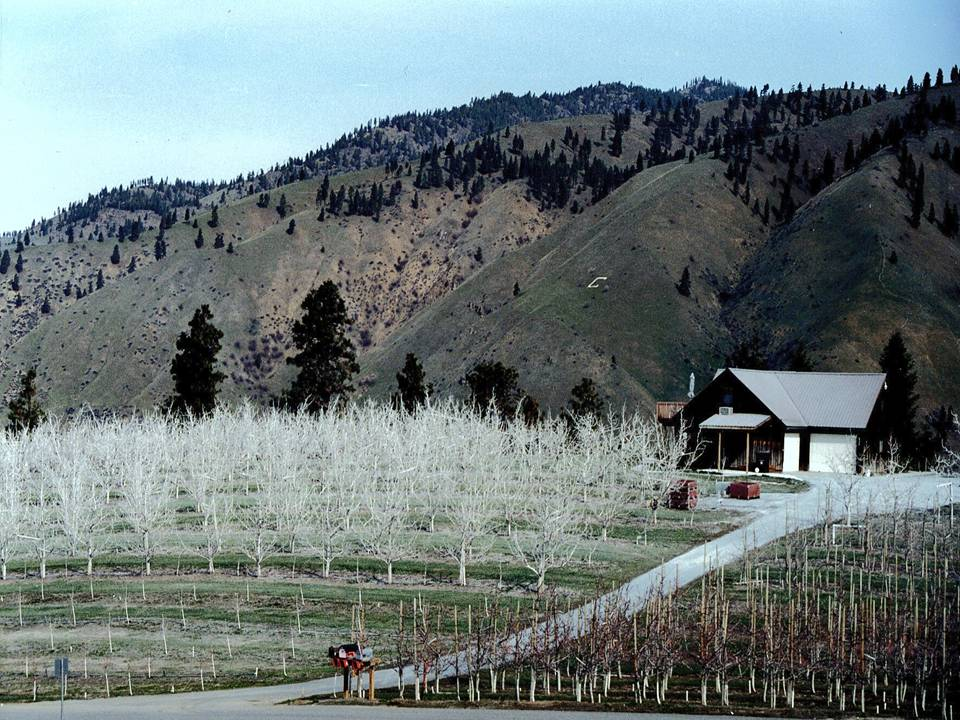
Commercial application of Surround WP kaolin spray on pear trees for control of pear psylla, Wenatchee, Washington, USA. Another popular application of this material is on apples for the prevention of sunburn.

Kaolin spray is a pest control that has kaolin as the main ingredient. The practice has been in recorded use from 2000 B.C.E. in China. More recent studies have shown that kaolin sprays can promote photosynthesis and are effective in reducing insects and disease on plants.

== Description ==
Kaolin is a rock rich with the clay mineral kaolinite. Kaolin spray is a pest control that has kaolin as the main ingredient.

== History ==
In nature, many animal species commonly take "dust baths" to rid themselves of insect parasites and prevent attacks from biting insects. In 2000 B.C.E., records in China describe the application of mineral-based dusts (e.g., diatomaceous earth) to plants to control insects. Subsequently, various mineral-based preparations have been used, and some of these remain in use for agricultural pest control.

More recently, kaolin mixed with spreaders and stickers and applied to plants as a spray at 1–6% concentration in water form has been shown to be an effective approach to agricultural pest control and to protect plants from environmental stresses. Kaolin-based sprays have been studied extensively since 1999 and research has established that these sprays deposit a "particle film" that has numerous beneficial effects on plants and in insect pest control. Certain kaolin-based sprays can form a highly reflective white film over plant surfaces that enhances plant photosynthesis and reduce heat stress in plants, which they do by reflecting the infra-red light spectrum, which in improves plant yields and fruit quality in orchards. The kaolin barrier created by the particle film also protects the treated plant surfaces from diseases, and insects.

== See also ==
- Medicinal clay
- Mechanical pest control
