= Garden gun =

Type of small bore shotguns commonly used by gardeners and farmers for pest control

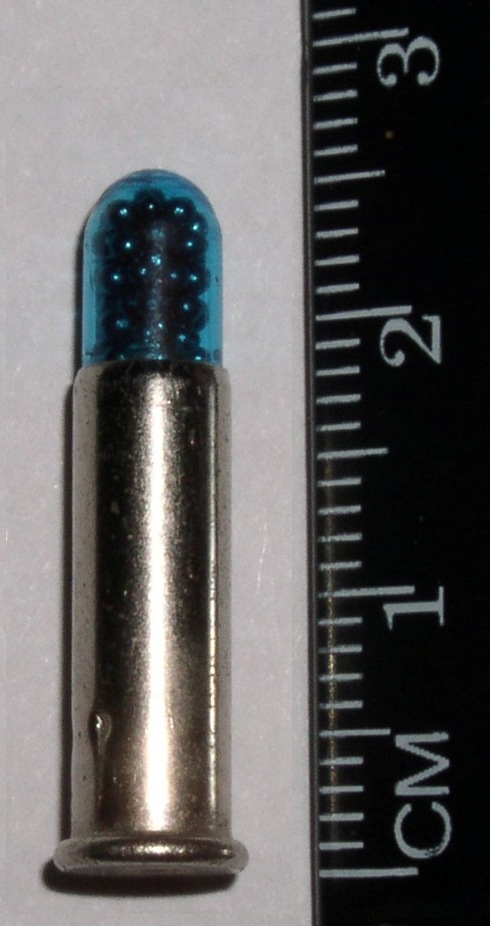
CCI .22LR snake shot loaded with No. 12 shot

Garden guns are small bore shotguns commonly used by gardeners and farmers for pest control. They are made to fire small gauges such as .410 bore, .360 bore, 9mm Flobert, and .22 Winchester Magnum Rimfire, or .22 Long Rifle rimfire shotshell cartridges. They are short-range shotguns that can do little harm past 15 to 20 yd (14 to 18 m), and they are relatively quiet when fired with rimfire ammunition. These guns are especially suitable for use inside barns and sheds, as the low-velocity small shot will not penetrate roofs or walls, nor injure livestock with a ricochet. Such guns are also used for pest control at airports, warehouses, stockyards, etc.

== .22 Rimfire ==
In North America, garden guns are usually chambered for .22 Rimfire and the most common cartridge is a .22 Long Rifle or .22 Winchester Magnum Rimfire loaded with No. 12 shot. From a standard rifle, these cartridges can produce effective patterns only to a distance of about 3 m (9.8 ft), but in a smooth bore garden gun, this can extend as far as 15 m (49 ft).

Examples of smooth-bore firearms include the: Marlin Model 25MG, Remington Model 511SB, Winchester Model 67.

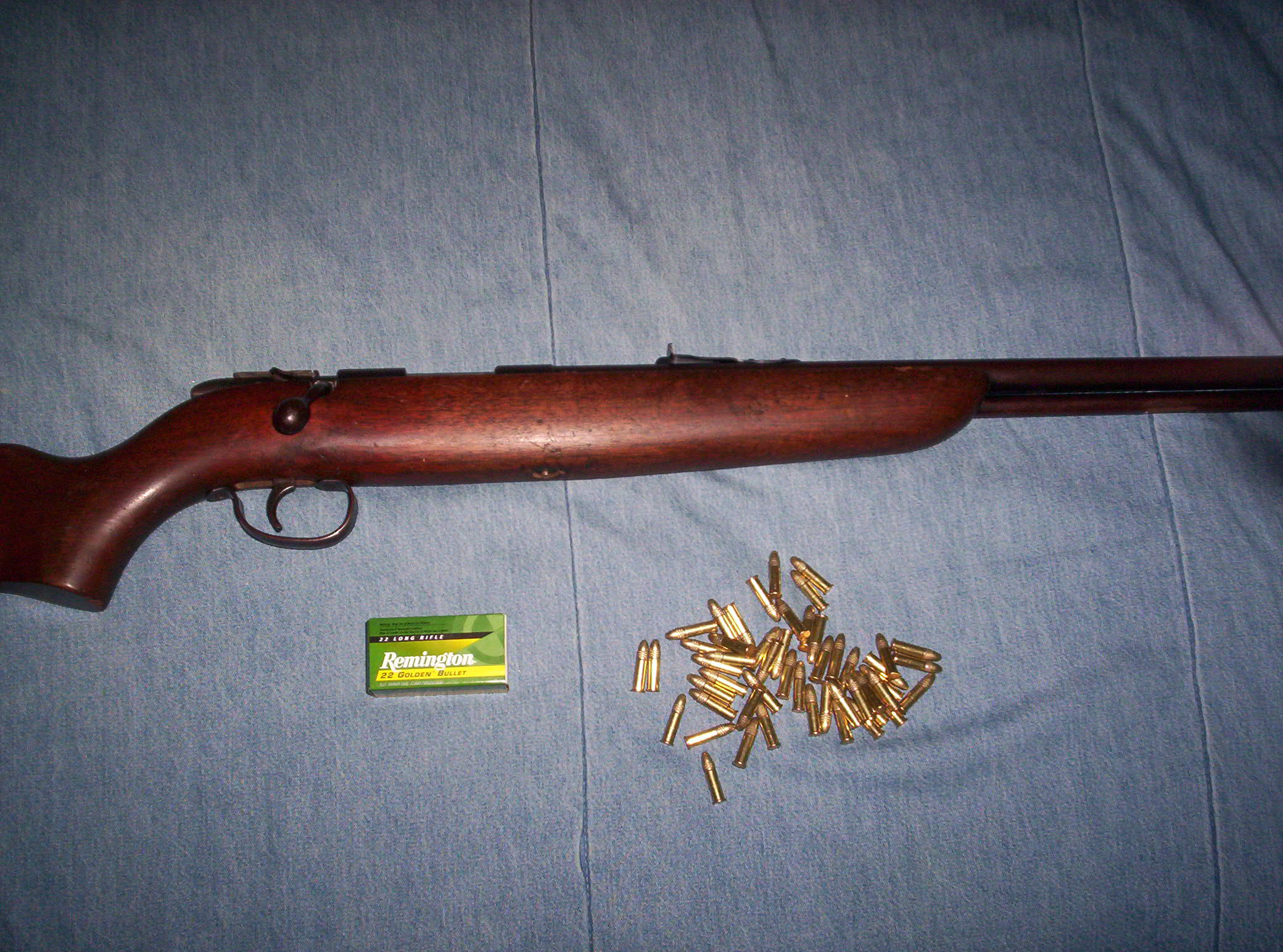
Remington Model 512 Sportmaster with standard .22LR ammunition

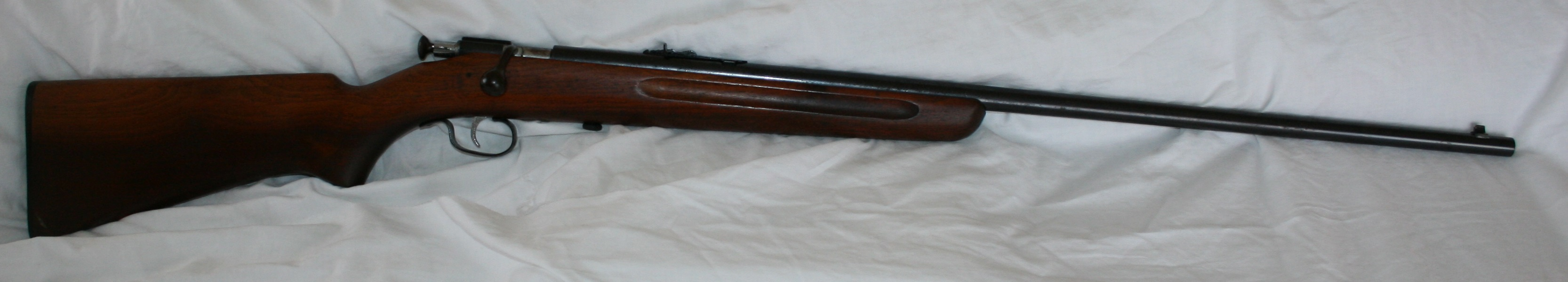
Winchester Model 67

== 9mm Flobert ==
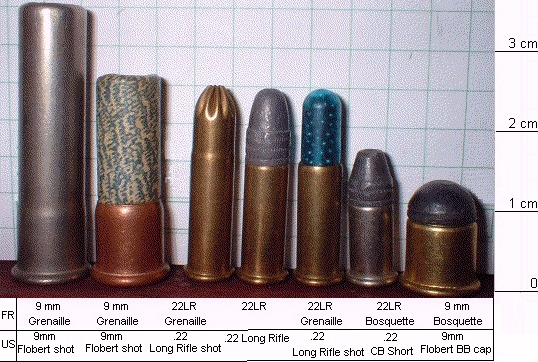
9mm Flobert shot, 9mm Flobert shot, .22 Long Rifle shot, .22 Long Rifle, .22 Long Rifle shot, .22 CB Short, and 9 mm Flobert BB cap

In Europe, garden guns designed for the 9mm Flobert rimfire shotshell cartridge are common, and face very little to no restriction, even in countries with strict gun laws. Its power and range are very limited, making it suitable only for pest control. Fiocchi-made 9mm Flobert rimfire ammunition uses a 1.75" brass shotshell firing 1/4 oz. of No. 8 shot with a velocity of 600 fps.

One example of this is the Chiappa Little Badger Shotgun.

== .410 bore ==
Small .410 bore shotguns such as the Snake Charmer are also commonly used by gardeners and farmers for pest control, and are sometimes called "garden guns". .410 shotguns loaded with shot shells are well-suited for small game hunting and pest control, including rabbits, squirrels, snakes, rats, and birds.

== See also ==
- Derringer – Small handgun
- Garrucha – Small handgun common in Brazil and Argentina in the early 20th century
- Gauge – Internal diameter of the barrel of a firearm
- Louis-Nicolas Flobert – French gunsmith and inventor (1819–1894)
- H&R Handy-Gun – Single-shot, breech-loading handgun
- Kit gun – Multi-purpose utility handguns
