= Snake shot =

Handgun and rifle cartridge loaded with lead shot

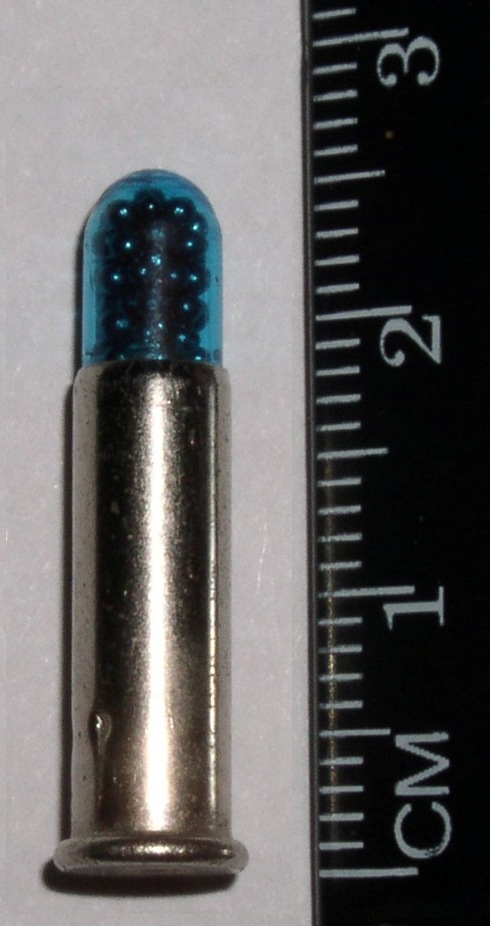
CCI .22LR snake shot loaded with No. 12 shot

Snake shot, rat shot, or dust shot, more formally known as shotshell (a name shared with the shotgun shell) or canister shot, refers to handgun and rifle cartridges loaded with lead shot canisters instead of bullets, intended for pest control (essentially small arms canister shot). The main targets for such ammunition are snakes, rodents, birds, and other pests at very close range.

The most common snake shot cartridge is .22 Long Rifle loaded with No. 12 shot. From a standard rifle, these can produce effective patterns only to a distance of about 3 m (9.8 ft), but in a smoothbore shotgun (or garden gun) that can extend as far as 15 m (49 ft).

== Uses ==
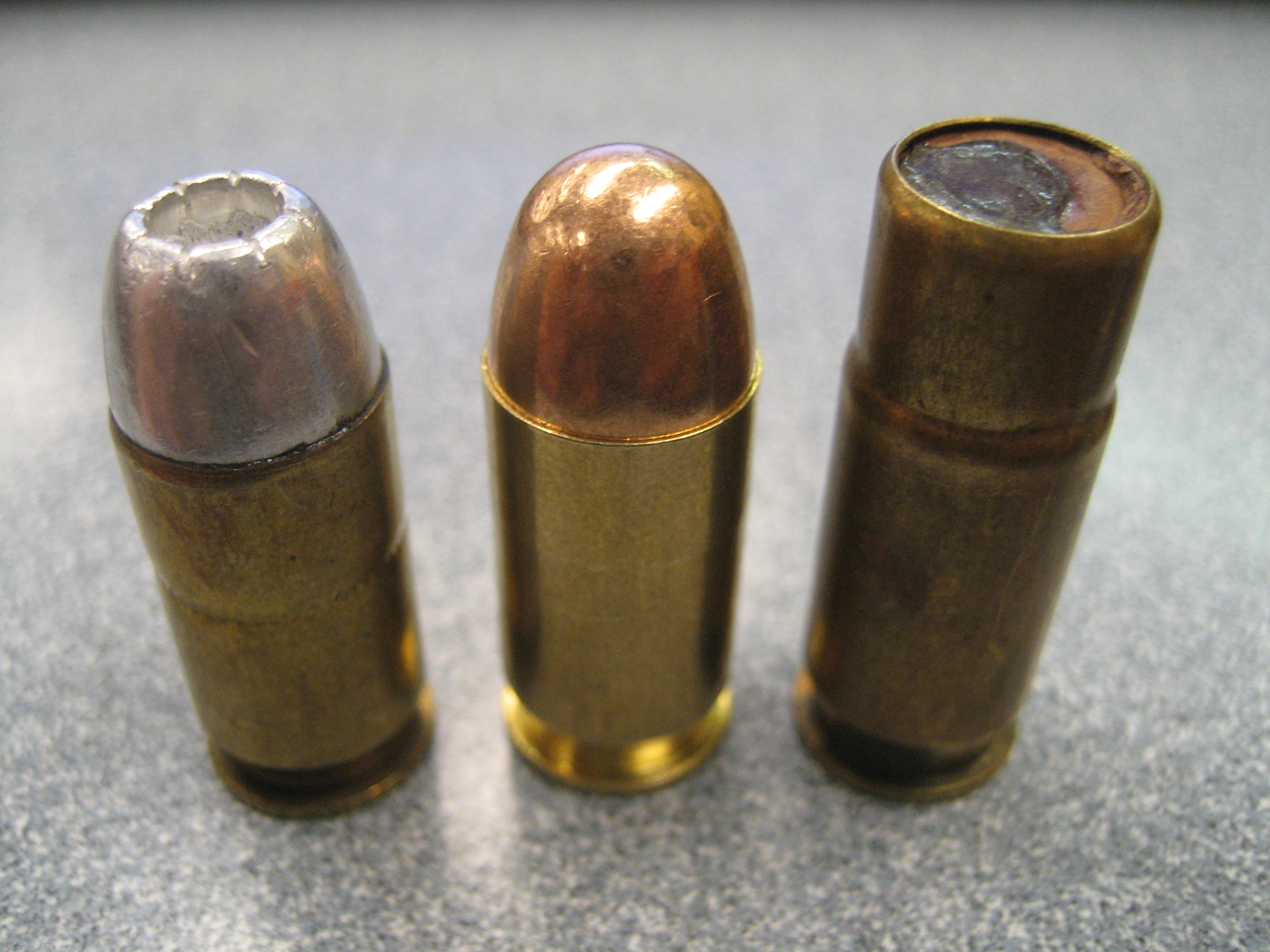
Military issue .45 ACP M15 "shot shell" on the far right

Snake shot is generally used for shooting at snakes, rodents, birds, and other pests at very close ranges. It is also used as foraging ammunition by hikers, backpackers, and campers. Snake shot is ideally suited for use in derringers and revolvers (especially "kit guns"), chambered for .22 Long Rifle, .38 Special, or .357 Magnum. Snake shot may not cycle reliably in semi-automatic pistols.

Shot shells have also been historically issued to soldiers to be used in standard-issue rifles and handguns.

The .45-70 "forager" round, which contained a thin wooden bullet filled with birdshot, was intended for hunting small game to supplement the soldiers' rations. This round in effect made the .45-70 rifle into a small gauge shotgun, capable of killing rabbits, ducks, and other similar game animals.

During World War II, the United States military developed both the .45 ACP M12 and M15 shot shells cartridges. They were issued to pilots, to be used as foraging ammunition in the event that they were either shot down or forced to land in known or unknown territory. The M15 cartridges were loaded with 118 pellets of No. 7 1/2 birdshot. The boxes were marked "For use in hunting small game effective range 25 ft (7.6 m)". While they were best used in the M1917 revolvers, the M15 cartridge would actually cycle the semi-automatic M1911 pistol's slide. The current CCI .45 ACP shotshell cartridge is virtually identical to these rounds.

== Snake shot shells ==
A regular Winchester .22 LR cartridge (left), with a star-crimped .22 Long Rifle snake shot cartridge loaded with No. 12 shot (right).

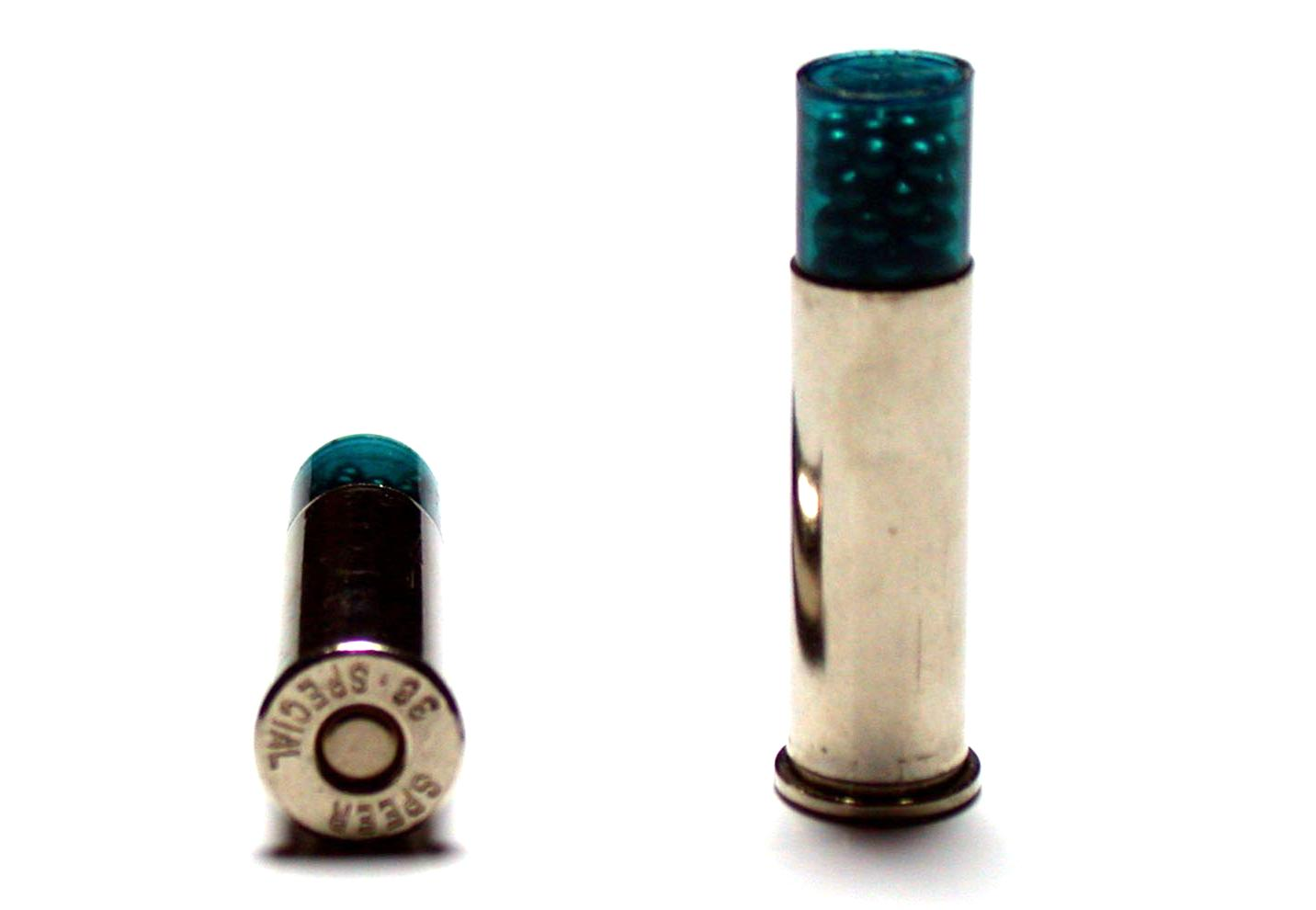
CCI .38 Special shot shells using plastic capsule

Both Winchester and Federal make star-crimped .22 Long Rifle snake shot loaded with No. 12 shot. These cartridges resemble traditional crimped blank cartridges.

CCI's rimfire and a few of the centerfire snake-shot cartridges use a hollow plastic capsule which holds the shot, and is often shaped like a bullet to aid in feeding. The plastic capsule shatters during firing, and allows the shot to disperse after it exits the muzzle of the barrel.

CCI pest control and centerfire pistol shot shell ammunition
Name/caliber	Muzzle velocity in ft/s (m/s)	Shot size No.	Approx. weight in grains (grams)	Box count
Rimfire Shotshell .22 Long Rifle	1,000 ft/s (300 m/s)	12	31 gr (2.0 g)	20
Rimfire Shotshell .22 Winchester Magnum Rimfire	1,000 ft/s (300 m/s)	12	52 gr (3.4 g)	20
Pest Control Shotshell 9mm Luger	1,450 ft/s (440 m/s)	12	53 gr (3.4 g)	10
Pest Control Big 4 Shotshell 9mm Luger	1,000 ft/s (300 m/s)	4	45 gr (2.9 g)	10
Pest Control Bismuth 9mm Luger	950 ft/s (290 m/s)	11	43 gr (2.8 g)	10
Pest Control Shotshell .38 Special/.357 Magnum	1,000 ft/s (300 m/s)	9	100 gr (6.5 g)	10
Pest Control Big 4 Shotshell .38 Special/.357 Magnum	1,100 ft/s (340 m/s)	4	84 gr (5.4 g)	10
Pest Control Bismuth Shotshell .38 Special/.357 Magnum	1,100 ft/s (340 m/s)	8	80 gr (5.2 g)	10
Pest Control Shotshell .40 Smith & Wesson	1,250 ft/s (380 m/s)	9	88 gr (5.7 g)	10
Pest Control Bismuth Shotshell .40 Smith & Wesson	1,300 ft/s (400 m/s)	8	78 gr (5.1 g)	10
Pest Control Shotshell 10mm Automatic	1,250 ft/s (380 m/s)	9	105 gr (6.8 g)	10
Pest Control Shotshell .44 Special/.44 Magnum	1,000 ft/s (300 m/s)	9	140 gr (9.1 g)	10
Pest Control Big 4 Shotshell .44 Special/.44 Magnum	1,000 ft/s (300 m/s)	4	110 gr (7.1 g)	10
Pest Control Bismuth Shotshell .44 Special/.44 Magnum	1,050 ft/s (320 m/s)	8	112 gr (7.3 g)	10
Pest Control Shotshell .45 Automatic Colt Pistol	1,100 ft/s (340 m/s)	9	120 gr (7.8 g)	10
Pest Control Bismuth Shotshell .45 Automatic Colt Pistol	1,050 ft/s (320 m/s)	8	130 gr (8.4 g)	10
Pest Control Shotshell.45 Colt	1,000 ft/s (300 m/s)	9	150 gr (9.7 g)	10
Pest Control Big 4 Shotshell .45 Colt	800 ft/s (240 m/s)	4	140 gr (9.1 g)	10
Pest Control Bismuth Shotshell .45 Colt	1,050 ft/s (320 m/s)	8	130 gr (8.4 g)	10

== Garden guns ==
"Garden guns" are smoothbore guns specifically made to fire .22 caliber snake shot or 9mm Flobert shot-shells, and are commonly used by gardeners and farmers for pest control. They are short-range weapons that do little harm at distances greater than 15 to 20 m (49 to 66 ft) and are quieter when fired with snake shot than with standard ammunition. The guns are especially useful inside barns and sheds, because the snake shot will not injure livestock with a ricochet, or make holes in the roof or walls of a structure. They are also used for pest control at airports, warehouses, stockyards, and similar locations.

== Safety considerations ==
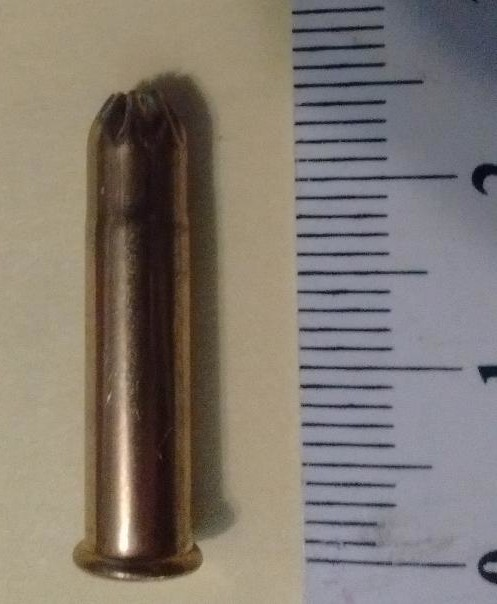
Federal 22 Long Rifle snake shot with crimped case

- Snake shot may be mistaken for traditional crimped blank cartridges.
- Snake shot may not function properly in semi-automatic firearms, causing malfunctions.
- Snake shot may not function properly in handguns and rifles not specifically made for their use.
- Snake shot may not function properly in lightweight revolvers, as they may cause "cylinder lock" due to the capsule movement resulting from recoil inertia. However, crimped cases do not exhibit this problem.
- Snake-shot plastic capsules may shatter when being fed from a magazine. Crimped cases do not exhibit this problem, but may fail to extract in semi-automatic firearms.
- Unsafe in firearms with suppressors, ported barrels, or ported recoil compensators.
- Snake shot is effective only against snakes, rodents, birds, and other small pests, and only at very close range.

== See also ==
- Canister shot
- Marlin Model 25MG
- Rimfire ammunition
- Snake Charmer (shotgun)
