= Marlin Model 25MG =

- Type: Shotgun
- Place of origin: United States

Production history
- Manufacturer: Marlin Firearms Company
- Produced: 1999—2002

Specifications
- Mass: 5.75 pounds (2.61 kg)
- Length: 41 inches (1,000 mm)
- Barrel length: 22 inches (560 mm)
- Cartridge: .22 WMR CCI snake shot
- Cartridge weight: 52 grains (3.4 g)
- Action: Bolt action
- Muzzle velocity: 1,000 ft/s (300 m/s)
- Effective firing range: 50 feet (17 yd; 15 m)
- Feed system: Detachable 7-round box magazine
- Sights: fluorescent orange front bead

The Marlin Model 25MG is a smooth bore, bolt-action, .22 WMR rifle manufactured by Marlin firearms Company. It was designed to shoot snake shot and marketed as a "Garden Gun" for use in dispatching small garden and farm pests. It also has been used for airport and warehouse pest control.

Based on earlier Marlin .22-caliber designs, the Garden Gun was equipped with a high-visibility front sight but no rear sight. It was available with either a black synthetic stock or a straight-combed hardwood stock.
