= Kit gun =

Multi-purpose utility handguns

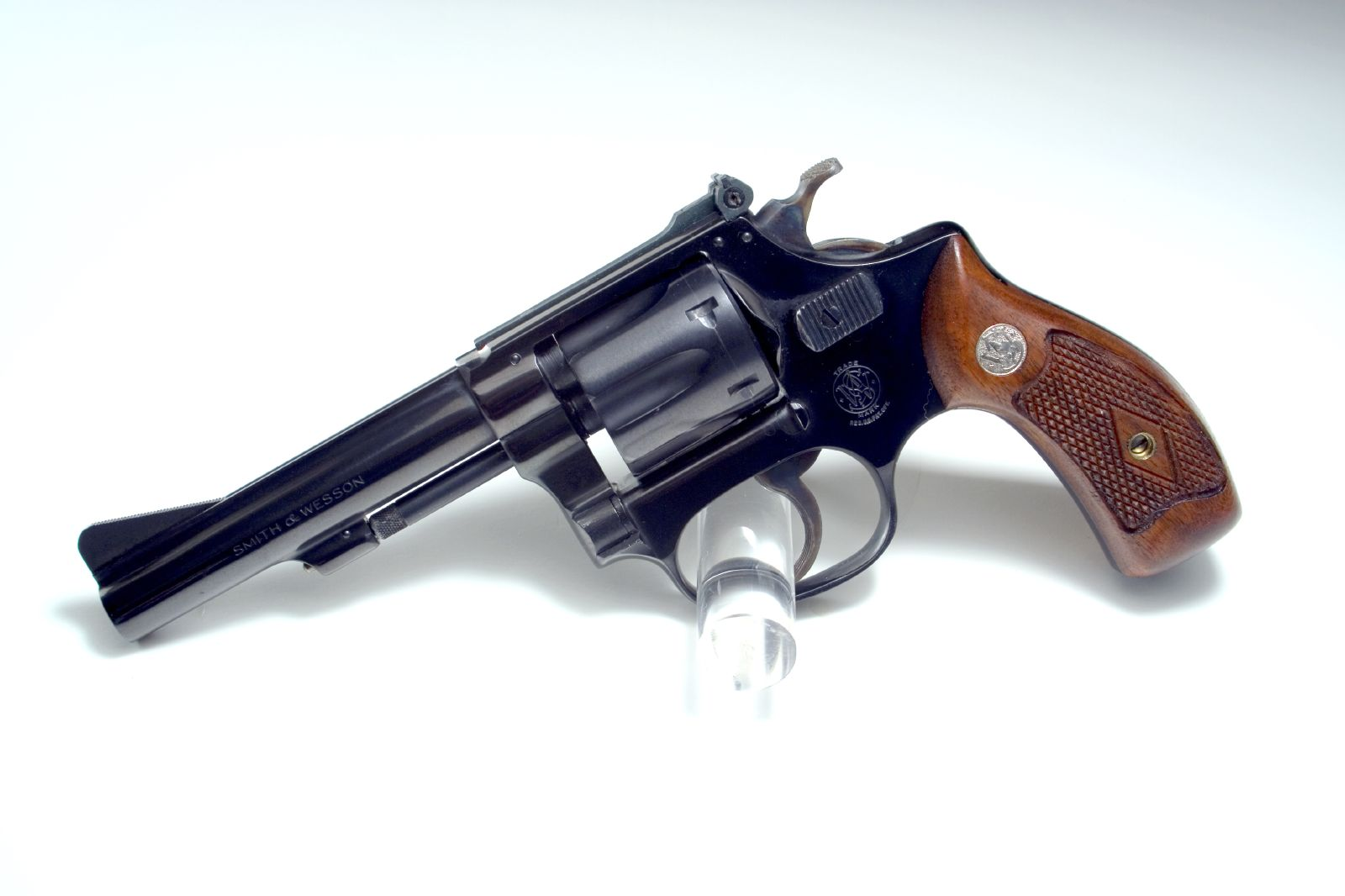
Smith & Wesson Model 22/32 Kit Gun

Kit guns are multi-purpose utility handguns, intended to be used for small game hunting, plinking, pest control, as ancillary weapons and self defense. They are generally small, lightweight, .22 rimfire revolvers, designed to be easily packed in a hunting, camping or fishing "kit". They are ideally suited for shooting snake shot at snakes, rodents, birds, and other pest at very close range. They are also commonly used as the coup de grâce by hunters and fishermen or as a method of animal euthanasia when drug overdose is not available.

== Smith & Wesson ==
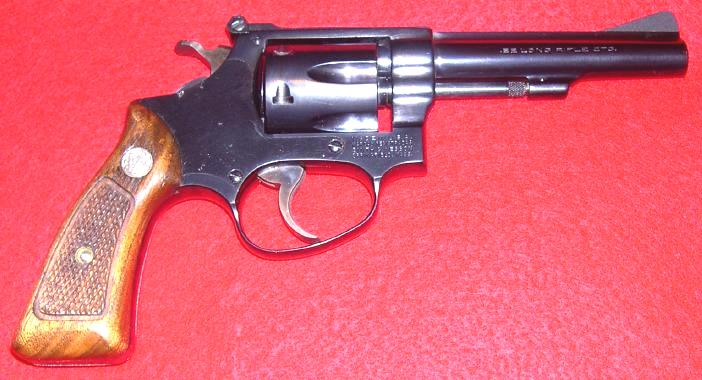
Smith & Wesson Model 34-1 Kit Gun

In 1911, the Kit Gun line began as the 22/32 an I-Frame, .22LR, 6-shot revolver. These are sometimes called the "pre-war" models. In 1953, an improved model was introduced, the "22/32 Kit Gun, Model of 1953”. In 1958, Smith & Wesson renamed it the Model 34 Kit Gun. This production line continued till 1960, when it was redesigned using the slightly larger J-frame and marketed as the model 34-1. The Model 34 continued to be manufactured until 1991.

The Smith & Wesson Target Model 1953 (AKA: Model 35) is a 6" barrel .22LR target revolver based on the 22/32 model. The rear sight was adjustable for both elevation and windage, the front sight had a distinctive T-shaped blade. Manufacture began in 1953, and it was discontinued in 1974.

In 1955, the Model 43 Airweight with an aluminum alloy frame was introduced. In 1960, a .22 Winchester Magnum Rimfire version the Model 51 was introduced. The Model 43 and 51 were discontinued in 1974. A stainless steel version the Model 63 Kit Gun was released in 1977. In 1983, the stainless steel Model 650 in .22 WMR was introduced. The 6-shot Model 63 was replaced by an 8-shot version in 1997.

In 1997, Smith & Wesson also introduced the new 8-shot Model 317 AirLite Kit Gun, and the later the .38 Special Model 337 AirLite Kit Gun, and a .44 Special Model 396 AirLite Mountain Lite Kit Gun. All are made of aluminum alloy frames and cylinders made of titanium (except the Model 317, whose cylinder is aluminum). Their aluminum barrels have a stainless steel liner.

== Other makers ==
Though not necessarily marketed under that term, other makers have produced firearms described as "kit guns" by shooters. H&R Firearms produced several series of good quality, reliable and relatively inexpensive .22LR revolvers commonly used as kit guns, most notably, the later 9-shot Model 900 series. The Ruger Bearcat, a small-framed single-action revolver, was introduced to meet the demand for a kit gun, as a smaller alternative to the Ruger Single Six.

Though most kit guns are revolvers, the Colt Woodsman Sport model has been described as a "near perfect 'kit gun' for the outdoorsman."

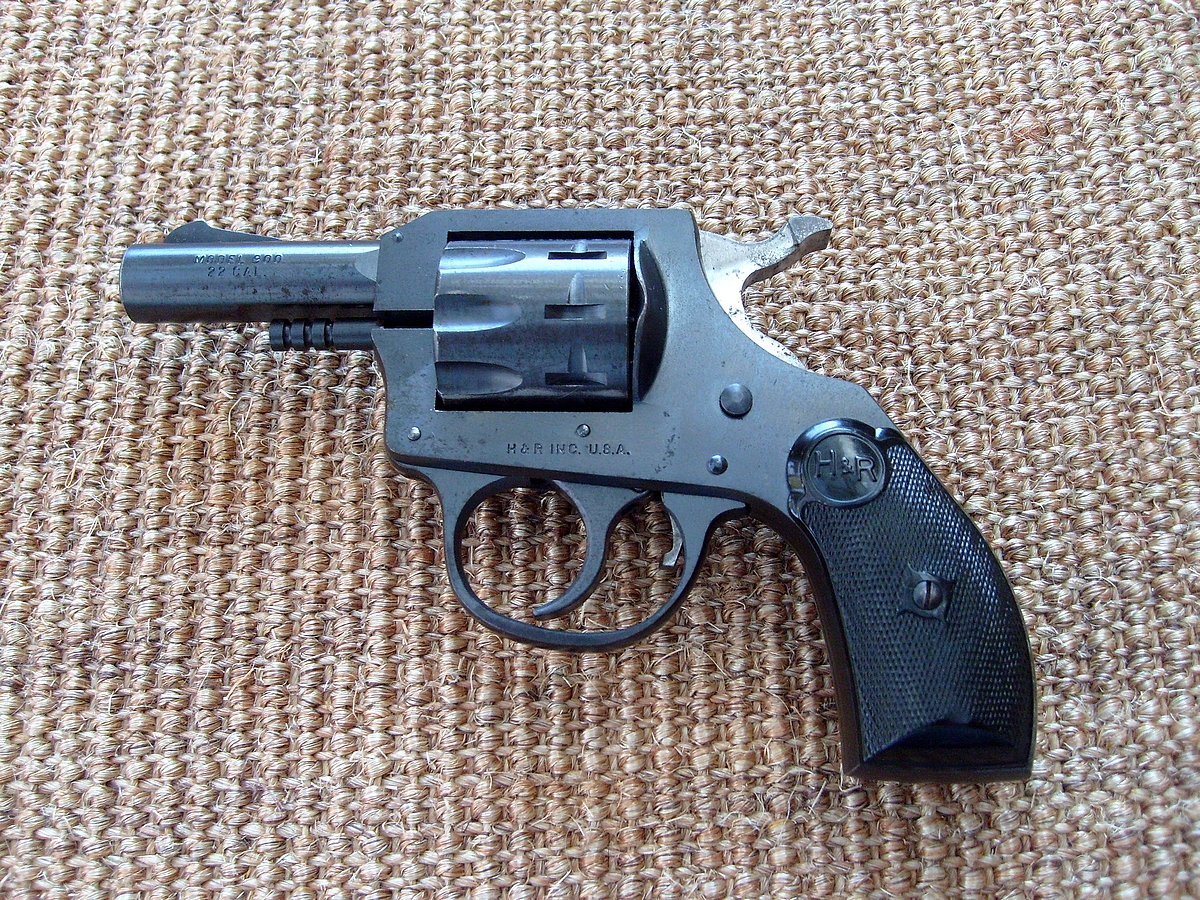
H&R Model 900 9-shot .22LR Revolver

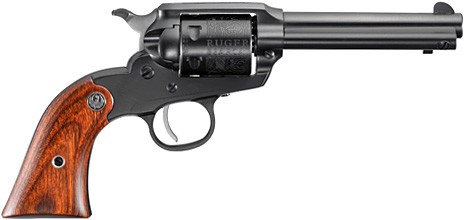
.22LR Ruger Bearcat

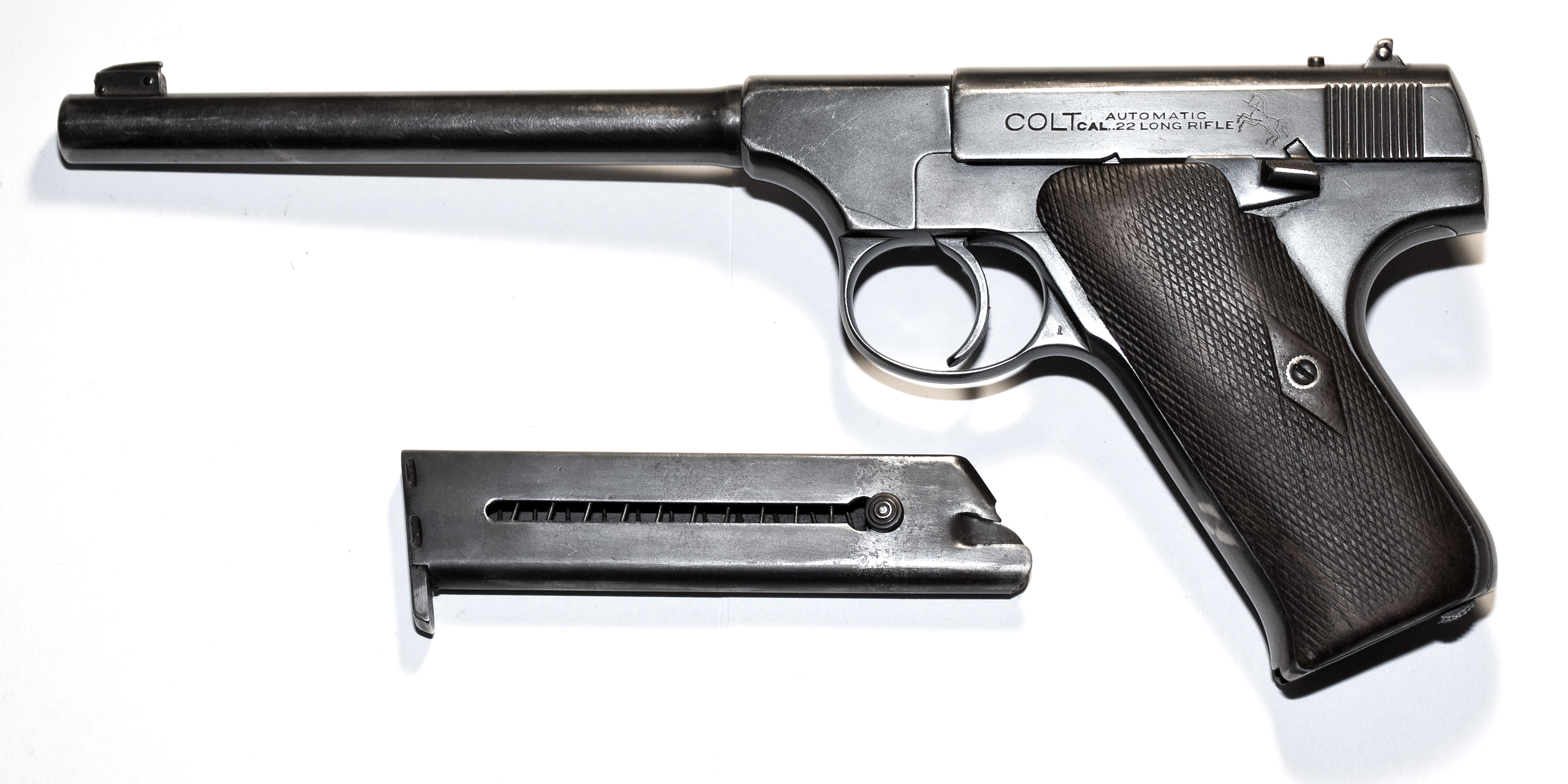
An early First Series Colt Woodsman

== See also ==
- Glossary of firearms terms
- Garden guns
- Takedown guns
- Flare gun
