= .360 bore =

Shotgun bore

The .360 bore (9.1 mm) is a shotgun bore. Its main uses included collecting ornithological specimens, pest control, and self-defense, often concealed in walking stick or cane guns. The .360 bore was first created by Eley Brothers Ltd, a London-based ammunition company founded in 1828. A .360 bore load is often defined as a "2 in (51 mm) orange-red paper cartridge with a brass head and rolled turnover, white top wad and loaded with No. 5 shot".
