= Mechanical pest control =

Mechanical pest control is the management and control of pests using physical means such as fences, barriers or electronic wires. It includes also weeding and change of temperature to control pests. Many farmers at the moment are trying to find sustainable ways to remove pests without harming the ecosystem.

== Methods ==
=== Handpicking ===
The use of human hands to remove harmful insects or other toxic material is often the most common action by gardeners. It is also classified as the most direct and the quickest way to remove clearly visible pests. However, it also has equal disadvantages as it must be performed before damage to the plant has been done and before the key development of insects.

=== Mechanical traps ===
Mechanical traps or physical attractants are used in three main ways: to efficiently trap insects, to kill them or to estimate how many insects are there in the total landmass using sampling method. However, some traps are expensive to produce and can end up benefiting insects rather than harming them.

== Differences from integrated pest control ==
Integrated pest control refers to the use of any means to control pests once they reach unacceptable levels. Mechanical pest control is but a minor part of integrated pest control. It means only the use of physical means to control pests.

== See also ==
- Biological pest control
- Kaolin spray

== External list ==
- Further Information
