= Smith & Wesson Model 317 kit gun =

Smith & Wesson Model 317 Kit Gun
- Type: Revolver
- Place of origin: United States

Specifications
- Mass: 12.5 oz (350 g)
- Length: 7.19 inches (18.3 cm)
- Barrel length: 3 inches (7.6 cm)
- Cartridge: .22 Long Rifle
- Action: Double-action
- Feed system: Eight round cylinder
- Sights: HI-VIZ Front, adjustable rear

The Smith & Wesson Model 317 Kit Gun is the current version the Smith & Wesson company's 'kit gun' line. It is a double-action revolver chambered for the .22 Long Rifle cartridge.

== History ==
The 317 was designed to be lighter than previous Smith & Wesson 'kit' guns carried for outdoor activities. Steel was replaced by titanium and aluminum for this purpose.

Between World War I and World War II, the kit bags carried by hunters, hikers, campers, and fisherman frequently had a small handgun inside. These kit bags carried many of the necessary items one might need when alone in the open country or forest. After this came the more compact .22/.32 Target I-frame revolvers. The .22/.32 Kit Gun was so named because it was intended to be carried in a kit bag.

The Kit Gun line began as an I-Frame, .22 caliber 6-shot revolver in 1953, and its model designation at the time was 'Model of 1953'. This is sometimes called the 'pre-34'. In 1958, S&W renamed it as the Model 34 and began stamping the models thus. This production continued till the early 1960s, when the pistol was redesigned using the larger J-frame and marketed as the model 34–1. Due to the growing popularity of stainless steel revolvers, the .22/.32 Model 63 Kit Gun was released in 1977 (with the same design as the 34–1), the .22 WMR Model 651 in 1983, and the .32 Magnum Kit Gun in 1990.

There was a Kit Gun Airweight (Model 43) and a Kit Gun chambered in .22 Winchester Magnum Rimfire (.22 WMR, the Model 51), the Target version with 6-inch barrel (Model 35), as well as the standard Kit Gun. All three were available with adjustable sights. The Model 34 continued to be manufactured until 1991, but Model 43 and 51 production stopped in 1974. The model 63 stainless was replaced by the significantly lighter model 317 in the late 2000s.

Older Kit Guns have been replaced, and though some come in larger calibers, they are even lighter. This is due to advances in titanium and aluminum construction. There is the Model 317 .22 Long Rifle (.22LR) AirLite Kit Gun, the Model 337 .38 Special AirLite Kit Gun, and a .44 Special Kit Gun, the Model 396 AirLite Mountain Lite Kit Gun.

These revolvers have aluminum alloy frames and cylinders made of titanium (except the Model 317, whose cylinder is aluminum). While titanium is considerably lighter than steel, it is just as strong. The aluminum barrels have a steel liner.

== Snub barrel variation ==
The Smith & Wesson Model 317 is a j frame the Models 17 or 617 are k frame and the 317 has an aluminum frame. It is extremely light at just 10.8 oz / 306.2 g (unloaded). The model 63 stainless also comes in an 8-shot, 3-inch barrel version also a j frame.
