= CCI Ammunition =

US ammunition manufacturer

- Type: Subsidiary
- Industry: Ammunition
- Founded: 1951
- Founder: Dick Speer
- Headquarters: Lewiston, Idaho, U.S.
- Products: Cartridges
- Parent: Czechoslovak Group
- Website: www.cci-ammunition.com

CCI Ammunition (formerly Cascade Cartridge, Inc.) is an ammunition manufacturer and a wholly owned subsidiary of the Czechoslovak Group, located in Lewiston, Idaho. CCI manufactures rimfire and centerfire handgun ammunition, including primers for handloaders and an industrial ammunition production line. CCI made the first .22 Long Rifle Mini-Mag rimfire ammunition in 1962 and, in 1975, they developed the .22 Stinger rimfire ammunition, a high velocity .22 Long Rifle product. Today, CCI makes a wide range of rimfire and snake shot ammunition.

== History ==
CCI was founded by Dick Speer (brother of Vernon Speer, who founded Speer Bullets) in the early 1950s. Arvid Nelson was a partner in the business. The firm's first shipment was part of a defense contract to make primers using chlorate FA-70. CCI later moved on to much safer formulas for sporting ammunition. CCI provided the first reliable supply of primers for hobby reloaders.

As of February 2015, it was a subsidiary of Vista Outdoor, a spinoff of Alliant Techsystems. As of the same date, CCI employed about 1,100 people. The company was sold to the Czechoslovak Group in November 2024.

CCI purchased 17 acres of land next to the Lewiston Gun Club. When the gun club moved, CCI purchased that land as well. As of 2020, CCI's plant was still located on this land.

== Product lines ==
In 1975, CCI engineers completed development of the first "hyper-velocity" .22 Long Rifle ammunition. This ammunition became known as the "CCI Stinger." The CCI Stinger has a slightly longer case length of .702 in (17.8 mm), compared to the standard case length of .613 in (15.6 mm) for the .22 Long Rifle, both of these cartridges have the same overall cartridge dimensions.

Although CCI's Blazer line officially launched in 1981, reports of niche "Blazer" branded rimfire ammunition appeared around 1972. Their Blazer 9mm Full metal jacket (ammunition) is one of the most popular training rounds in America.

In early 2020, CCI introduced 14 new products.

CCI/Speer sells the Gold Dot line, component bullets, and handgun ammunition using a bonded copper-plated hollow point bullet. Plated bullets were originally sold only for handloading as a cheap substitute for jacketed bullets.

CCI sells the MeatEater line of hunting ammunition for small game. CCI partnered with Steven Rinella of MeatEater to produce and market this product line. The MeatEater line of ammunition includes Copper-22, Mini-Mag, and Maxi-Mag variants.

In 2023, CCI introduced Clean-22 Hyper Velocity ammunition; this adds to their line of polymer-coated rimfire ammunition. Polymer coatings significantly reduce lead fouling in barrels.
