= Chiappa Firearms =

Italian firearms manufacturer

- Type: Family-owned
- Industry: Arms industry
- Predecessor: Armi Sport
- Founded: 1958; 68 years ago
- Founder: Ezechiele Chiappa
- Headquarters: Brescia, Italy
- Key people: Rino Chiappa (CEO)
- Products: Firearms
- Number of employees: 50
- Parent: Chiappa Group
- Divisions: Chiappa Firearms, Ltd., Armi Sport, Kimar
- Website: www.chiappafirearms.com

Chiappa Firearms, Armi Sport di Chiappa, is an Italian firearms manufacturing company based in Brescia. It was founded in 1958 by Ezechiele Chiappa as Armi Sport. Total unit production is around 60,000 per year. Its U.S. headquarters are in Dayton, Ohio.

== Armi Sport ==
Armi Sport is the firearms manufacturing branch. Its target markets are target shooting, Cowboy Action Shooting, reenacting, collecting, and hunting. To this end, most of its firearms are reproductions of older, muzzle-loading guns and other classic arms (such as Winchester rifles), though it manufactures other designs, such as .22 LR versions of the M1911 pistol and a .22 upper receiver for the AR-15. It also produces an original revolver, the Chiappa Rhino.

=== Handguns ===
The following pistols are available in cal.22 LR, in multiple variants (various finishes or grips):

- Chiappa 1911–22 (Colt 1911 5-inch replica)
- Chiappa M9-22 (Beretta 92 replica)
- Chiappa Model 1911–22 (Colt 1911 5-inch replica)
- Chiappa Model 1911–22 Compact (Colt 1911 4-inch replica)
- Chiappa Model 1911–22 Custom (Colt 1911 replica)
- Chiappa FAS 6007 (Based on Fabbrica Armi Sportivi SP 607)

The following pistols are available in defensive calibers, multiple variants (various finishes or grips):

- Chiappa 1911 cal (both 9MM and .45ACP) (Colt GOVT model clone).
- Chiappa SAA17-10 .17HMR (1873 Replica 7.5" barrel)
- Chiappa M9 9MM (both full size and compact) (Beretta 92FS clone). Both variants accept Beretta parts and magazines.
- Chiappa M9 (.40SW) (Beretta Model 96 clone) accepts Beretta parts and magazines.
- Chiappa M27E (both .40Cal and 9MM) (CZ75 Clone) (DAO and DA/SA).
- Chiappa Rhino is a revolver chambered for the .357 Magnum, 9mm Parabellum, .40 S&W, or 9×21mm cartridges. Its most distinctive feature is that the barrel is on a low axis compared to other revolvers. The Rhino fires from the lowermost chamber of the cylinder, rather than firing from the topmost chamber.
- Puma Bounty Hunter is a lever-action pistol based on the Mare's Leg rifle and chambered in .45 Colt, .44-40 Winchester, .38-40 Winchester, .44 Magnum or .357 Magnum.

=== Long-guns ===
Chiappa manufactures rifles, shotguns, including single shot (garden guns), combination and triple-barrelled varieties.

- Chiappa Little Badger is a single-shot rimfire survival rifle with a 16.5 inch barrel, chambered for .22LR, .22WMR, .17WSM and .17HMR.
- Little Badger Shotgun is a garden gun version and is virtually identical to the rifle, except that it fires 9mm Flobert shot-shells from a 24-inch smooth-bore barrel.
- Chiappa Little Badger Deluxe Shotgun is the garden gun version. Unlike the other versions, it features wooden furniture. It also fires 9mm Flobert shot-shells from a 24-inch smooth-bore barrel.
- Chiappa Double Badger is an over and under combination gun that comes in three versions a .22 LR over .410 bore, a .22 WMR over .410 bore and a .22 LR over 20 gauge. It is marketed as "a great choice for hunting, survival or fun recreational shooting".
- Chiappa M6 Survival Gun is an over and under combination gun that comes in four versions; with a 12-gauge or 20-gauge shotgun barrel over a .22 Long Rifle or .22 Magnum barrel.
- Chiappa Triple Crown shotguns are triple-barrel, break-action shotguns, chambered in 12-, 20-, 28- and .410-gauge. The 12-gauge model has 28 inch barrels while the others have 26 inch barrels.
- Chiappa Triple Threat shotguns are 18½ inch triple-barrel, break-action shotguns, chambered in both 12- and 20-gauge. They feature a unique two-piece removable butt-stock design allowing them to be shortened to an overall length of 27¾ inches.

Chiappa also manufactures black powder guns commonly used by reenactors and historical firearms enthusiasts.

- Springfield Model 1842
- Springfield Model 1855
- Springfield Model 1861
- Pattern 1853 Enfield
- Richmond Rifle
- Sharps Rifle

Several classic lever-action rifles are also made by Chiappa as well.

- Spencer rifle
- Winchester Model 1886
- Winchester Model 1892

== Kimar ==
Kimar manufactures unlicensed blank-fire replica firearms, air guns, non-lethal weapons and small caliber guns made in Italy. Its focus is on producing blank-firing guns for training purposes, flare guns, starter pistols, and theater and movie prop guns. It also provides training for hunting and working dogs.

=== Blank firing revolvers ===
The following revolvers are available in two versions, cal.9mm R/.380 or 35gr (front firing "signal version") and cal.9mm R/.380 (top firing "starter version"), as well as in two variants (black or steel finish).

- Kimar Python 4" (Colt Python 4-inch replica)

=== Blank firing pistols ===
The following pistols are available in two versions, cal.9mm PAK (front firing "signal version") or cal.8mm PAK (top firing "starter version"), as well as in two variants (black or steel finish).

- Kimar 75 AUTO (CZ 75 replica)
- Kimar 911 (Colt M1911A1 replica)
- Kimar Mod. 85 AUTO (Beretta 85 replica)
- Kimar Mod. 92 AUTO (Beretta 92 replica)
- Kimar Mod. LADY K (Walther PPK replica)
- Kimar PK4 (Beretta Px4 Storm replica)

The following model is available in 6 mm (top firing "starter version") as well as in three variants (black, steel or gold finish).

- Kimar Derringer (Remington Model 95 replica)

The following model is available in 6 mm (top firing "starter version") and only in black finish.

- Kimar M.302 – C.1861 (Umarex Mod. 302 replica)

=== Airguns ===
The following CO_{2} pistol is available in cal.4.5mm/.177:

- Kimar AG92 Airgun (Beretta 92 replica)
- Rhino Chiappa

=== Pneumatic air pistols ===
The following single shot pistol is available in cal.4.5mm/.177:

- Chiappa Firearms FAS 6004 (Fabbrica Armi Sportivi AP 604 replica)

=== Flare pistols ===
The following single shot pistol is available in cal.26.5mm/1 inch:

- Kimar Very (designed by Kimar)

== Costa srl. ==
A division of the group that specializes in the surface treatment of metal parts, an important consideration in the manufacture of firearms.

== See also ==
- A. Uberti, Srl.
- Davide Pedersoli
