= Aircrew survival weapon =

Aircrew survival weapon may refer to:

- M6 aircrew survival weapon
- Armalite AR-5
- Armalite AR-7
- TP-82 Cosmonaut survival pistol
- Chiappa M6 survival gun
