= Chiappa Double Badger =

Italian combination gun

Double Badger
- Type: Break-action combination gun
- Place of origin: Italy

Production history
- Manufacturer: Chiappa Firearms
- Unit cost: US$429 (MSRP as of 2018)

Specifications
- Mass: 5.8 lb (2.6 kg)
- Length: 36 in (91 cm)
- Barrel length: 19 in (48 cm)
- Cartridge: .22 LR over .410 bore; .22 WMR over .410 bore; .22 LR over 20 gauge; .243 Winchester over .410 bore
- Action: Break-action
- Sights: Iron sights

The Chiappa Double Badger is an Italian made over and under combination gun manufactured by Chiappa Firearms. It comes in four versions: .22 LR over .410 bore, .22 WMR over .410 bore, .22 LR over 20 gauge, and .243 Winchester over .410 bore. It's marketed as "a great choice for hunting, survival, or fun recreational shooting".

== Design ==
The Double Badger is a standard wooden stock combination gun that "has the look, feel and function of an over and under shotgun". It comes in four versions: a .22 LR over .410 bore, a .22 WMR over .410 bore, a .22 LR over 20 gauge, and a .243 Winchester over .410 bore. It is 5.8 pounds, has 19-inch barrels, and an overall length of 36 inches. It has double triggers, with the front trigger firing the lower shotgun barrel and the back trigger firing the upper rimfire barrel. It uses a lever-action that both cocks the internal hammers and opens the action. It has a tang safety located at the top rear (or "tang") of the receiver. It comes with Williams Fiber Optic Ghost ring sights and a 3/8” dovetail rail for mounting optics. It can be folded in half to 21.2 inches in length for ease of storage.

The 20-gauge barrels are threaded and will accept standard Remington Choke tubes. It comes with a modified choke.

== See also ==
- Chiappa Little Badger
- Chiappa M6 Survival Gun
- Chiappa Triple Crown
- Savage Model 24
