= Chiappa Little Badger =

Italian survival rifle

Little Badger
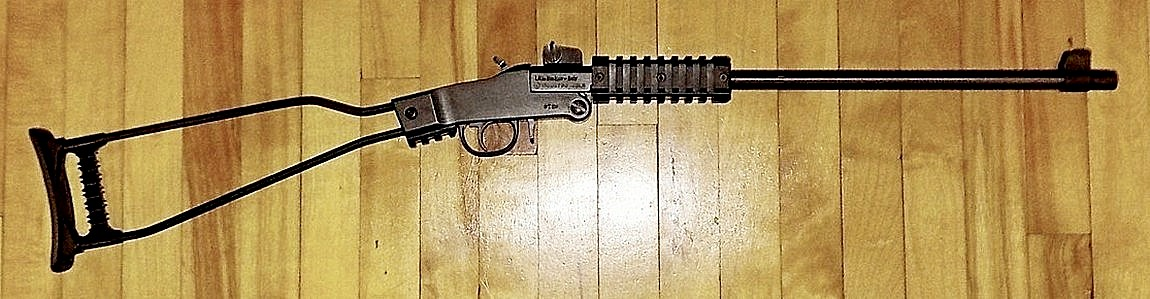
- Type: Break-action rifle
- Place of origin: Italy

Production history
- Manufacturer: Chiappa Firearms
- Unit cost: $229 USD (MSRP in 2018)
- Variants: Little Badger Shotgun; Little Badger Deluxe Shotgun

Specifications
- Mass: 2.9 lb (1.3 kg)
- Length: 31 in (79 cm)
- Barrel length: 16.5 in (42 cm)
- Cartridge: .22 LR; .22 WMR; .17WSM; .17HMR; 9 mm Flobert Grenaille
- Action: Break-action
- Feed system: Single-shot
- Sights: Iron sights and Picatinny rails

The Chiappa Little Badger is a family of Italian-made survival rifles and shotguns manufactured by Chiappa Firearms. The three basic models are chambered for .22LR, .22 WMR, .17WSM, .17HMR, and 9mm Flobert.

== Little Badger Survival Rifle ==
The Little Badger Survival Rifle has a barrel length of 16.5 inches and measures 31 inches overall. It is a single-shot break-action rifle and, when folded, measures around 17.5 inches. The Little Badger features a wire buttstock and has a 12-round ammunition holder. Unloaded, it weighs approximately 2.9 pounds. Its safety mechanism is its hammer, which can be half-cocked to prevent accidental firing. The barrel is threaded at 28 threads per inch. Some versions use 1/2x20 TPI It uses M1 carbine-type sights and Picatinny rails on the barrel for additional sights, tac-lights, etc. An additional small section of picatinny rail sits behind the trigger, allowing the user to add a pistol grip. This model is chambered for .22LR, .22 WMR, .17WSM and .17HMR.

== Little Badger Shotgun ==
The Little Badger Shotgun is a garden gun version and is virtually identical to the rifle, except that it fires 9mm Flobert shot-shells from a 24-inch smooth-bore barrel, and lacks the sights and Picatinny rails.

== Little Badger Deluxe Shotgun ==
The Little Badger Deluxe Shotgun is another garden gun configuration. It features wooden furniture. It is 38.5 inches in overall length and fires 9mm Flobert shot-shells from a 24-inch smooth-bore barrel.

== See also ==
- Chiappa Double Badger
- Chiappa M6 Survival Gun
- Chiappa Triple Crown
