= Chiappa Triple Crown =

Triple-barrel shotgun

CharlesDaly Barrel Shotgun
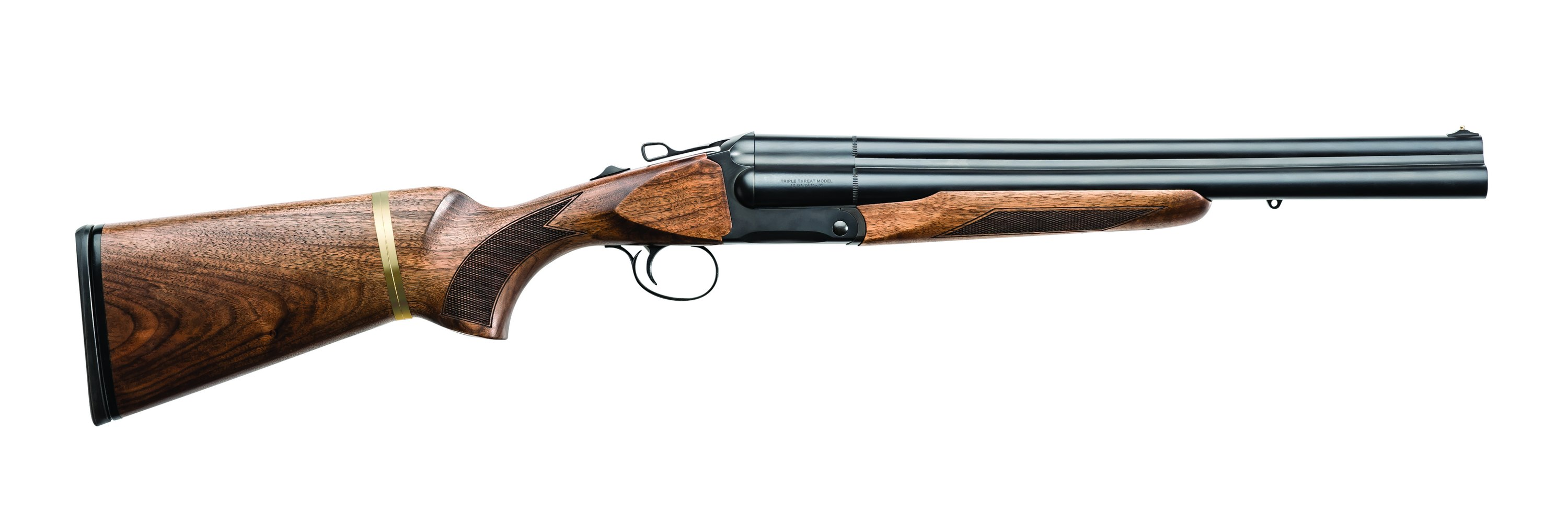
- CharelsDaly Triple Threat version
- Type: Break-action shotgun
- Place of origin: Türkiye

Production history
- Designer: Akkar
- Manufacturer: Akkar Silah Sanayi
- Unit cost: $1,955 USD (MSRP as of 2018)
- Variants: Triple Crown; Triple Threat; Triple Threat BLK; Honcho Triple

Specifications
- Mass: 8.2 lb (3.7 kg)
- Length: Standard 35.5 in (90 cm); Shorten 27.75 in (70.5 cm)
- Barrel length: 18.5 in (47 cm)
- Cartridge: 12-gauge, 20-gauge, 28-gauge, and .410-bore
- Barrels: 3
- Action: Break-action
- Sights: Fixed fiber optic

The CharlesDaly Triple Barrel or Mammut is a family of Turkish-made triple-barrel, break-action shotguns, chambered in 12-gauge, 20-gauge, 28-gauge, and .410 bore. The barrels have a triangular arrangement with one on top and two below. This gives the shotgun a single-barrel sight picture. Manufactured by Akkar and marketed by the company as the Mammut, they are more widely known as the Triple Crown and Triple Threat when branded as CharlesDaly for the American market and imported by Chiappa Firearm USA Ltd.

== Triple Crown ==
The Triple Crown shotguns are triple-barrel, break-action shotguns, chambered in 12-, 20-, 28-gauge, and .410 bore. The 12-, 20-gauge, and .410 bore models will accept 3-inch magnum shells and the 28-gauge model will accept 2-3/4-inch shells. The 12-gauge model has 28-inch barrels, while all of the other models have 26-inch barrels. The barrels have a triangular arrangement with one on top and two below. This gives the Triple Crown a single-barrel sight picture. The barrels accept standard Rem-Choke style choke tubes and it comes with 5 choke tubes ranging from Improved Cylinder to Full Choke. It uses a single trigger and has a manual safety on the tang behind the action lever. The Triple Crown may be disassembled for ease of storage.

== Triple Threat ==
The Triple Threat shotguns are the shorter 18-½-inch models chambered in both 12-, 20-gauge, and .410-bore 3-inch magnums. They feature a unique two-piece removable butt-stock design allowing them to be shortened to an overall length of 27-¾ inches.

=== Triple Threat BLK ===
The Triple Threat BLK comes in a 12-gauge 3-inch chamber only. It features Picatinny rails on the top barrel and below the bottom barrels. This allows for this model to use a wide range of optical sights and tac-lights. It also features black plastic furniture. However, unlike the basic model, the BLK uses a standard butt-stock that cannot be shortened.

== See also ==
- Chiappa Little Badger Deluxe Shotgun
- Chiappa Double Badger
- Chiappa M6 Survival Gun
- Combination gun
- M30 Luftwaffe Drilling
