= Springfield Armory M6 Scout =

Rifle, M6 Scout
- Type: Survival gun
- Place of origin: United States

Specifications
- Mass: 4.7 pounds (2.1 kg)
- Length: 32 inches (81 cm) (O/A length); 18.25 inches (46.4 cm) (folded)
- Barrel length: 18.25 inches (46.4 cm)
- Cartridge: .22 LR, .22 Magnum, or .22 Hornet over .410 bore
- Action: Break-action
- Feed system: one rifle barrel over one shotgun barrel

The Springfield Armory M6 Scout is a .22 Hornet over .410 bore combination gun derived from the M6 Aircrew Survival Weapon. It is also made in .22 Long Rifle over .410 bore and .22 Magnum over .410 bore. The Scouts are made with 18.25 inches (46.4 cm) barrels, as opposed to the original M6's 14 inches (36 cm) barrel length, to comply with National Firearms Act. The later models have large over-sized trigger guards and Picatinny rails for mounting a wide range of sights and scopes. They come in stainless steel or with a Parkerized finish.

== Characteristics ==
The Springfield Armory M6 Scout is derived from fhe Ithaca M6 Aircrew Survival Weapon. The Scout is also made of stamped sheet steel, with a forged steel removable barrel assembly. The barrel assembly is connected to the stock/action group by means of a removable hinge pin. Whether folded or disassembled, the overall length for storage is approximately 18.5 inches which is the length of the barrels. Unlike nearly all other firearms, there is no "furniture" on the Scout like a buttstock or a forearm. The only parts which are not steel are the rubber butt plate and cheek rest. Aircrew were instructed to wrap the barrels with parachute cord as a field expedient fore-stock.

The Scout has a rifle barrel mounted above a .410 shotgun barrel, this is known as a superposed "over-under" design. Its upper rifle barrel is chambered for .22 Long Rifle or .22 Magnum, in addition to the .22 Hornet used by the USAF M6. The Scout comes with iron sights and the later models have Picatinny rails for mounting a wide range of sights and scopes.

The original USAF Ithaca M6 stock held 9 rounds of .22 Hornet ammunition and four .410 shells, and the Scout holds 12 rounds of .22 Hornet and 4 shotgun shells. For the rim-fire models, the stock holds 15 rimfire cartridges and four shotgun shells.

One other unique feature of the M6 is the "squeeze-bar trigger". Intended for use by aircrew who might be downed in any type of weather and terrain, the trigger, hammer, and barrel latch are designed to be easily operated while wearing heavy gloves or mittens. To this end, the USAF Ithaca M6 was the only firearm issued to American armed forces that had no trigger guard. The amount of pressure needed to release the sear, combined with the practice of keeping the hammer uncocked unless preparing to fire, was considered sufficient to counter any risk of accidental discharge. Springfield Armory's version included a large over-sized trigger guard.

== See also ==
- M6 Aircrew Survival Weapon
- Chiappa M6 Survival Gun
