= M6 aircrew survival weapon =

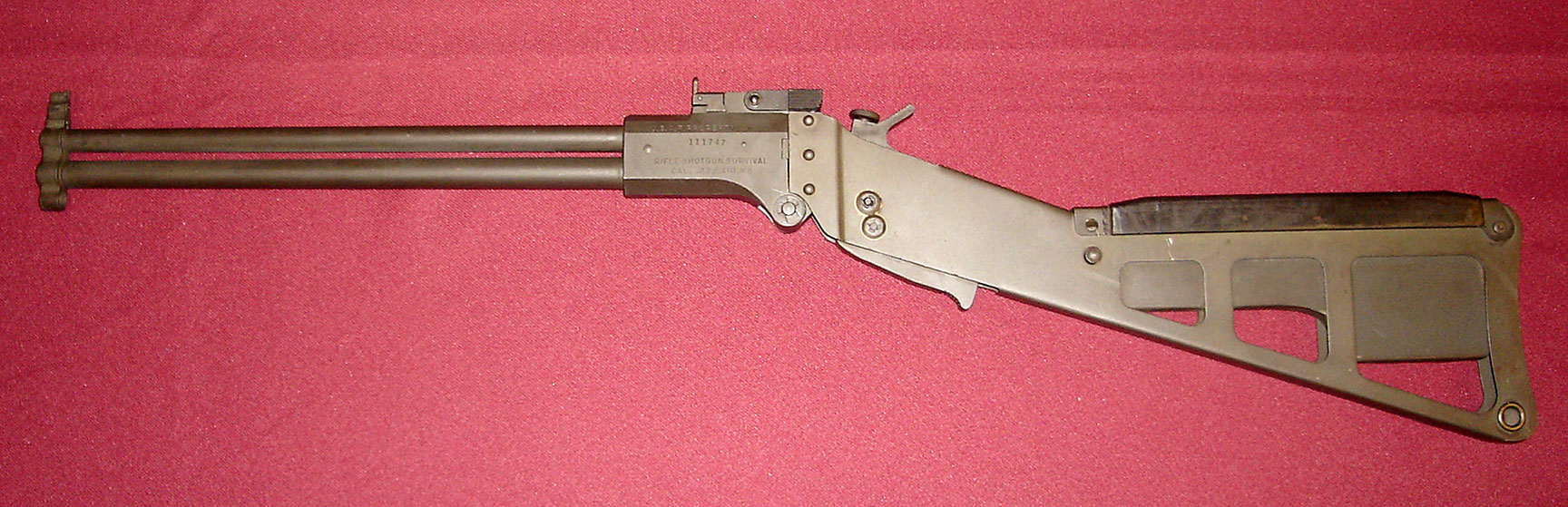
- Original USAF M6 Survival Rifle/Shotgun
- Type: Combination gun
- Place of origin: United States

Service history
- In service: 1952–1970s
- Used by: United States Air Force

Production history
- Manufacturer: Ithaca Gun Company, Springfield Armory, Inc.

Specifications
- Mass: 4.5 lb (2.0 kg)
- Length: 28.27 in (718 mm) overall, 15 in (380 mm) folded
- Barrel length: 14 in (360 mm)
- Cartridge: .22 Hornet.410 bore shotgun
- Barrels: 2
- Action: break action
- Muzzle velocity: 2,740 ft/s (840 m/s) (.22 Hornet); 1,130 ft/s (340 m/s) (.410 bore)
- Maximum firing range: 109 yd (100 m) (.22 Hornet); 27 yd (25 m) (.410 bore)
- Sights: Iron

The M6 aircrew survival weapon was a specially-made .22 Hornet over .410 bore combination gun issued to United States Air Force aircrews to help forage for food in the event of a plane crash. It was issued from 1952 until the early 1970s, in conjunction with the M4 Survival Rifle. Plans to replace both with the ArmaLite AR-5 (aka: MA-1) never came to fruition and in 2018 was instead replaced with the GAU-5A Aircrew Self Defense Weapon in some instances.

== History ==
The M6 was originally developed in 1946 for the Air Materiel Command of what was then still the United States Army Air Forces by the United States Army Ordnance Corps. Its official designation was Rifle-Shotgun, Survival, Caliber .22/.410. It was designed to fit into the standard USAAF (later USAF) survival kit issued to all pilots flying over the Arctic and other uninhabited regions.

== Design ==
The M6 is made of stamped sheet steel, with a forged steel removable barrel assembly. The barrel assembly is connected to the stock/action group by means of a removable hinge pin. Unlike nearly all other firearms, there is no "furniture" on the M6 like a butt stock or a forearm, the only parts which are not steel are the rubber butt plate and cheek rest. Aircrew were instructed to wrap the barrels with parachute cord as a field expedient fore-stock.

The M6 was a superposed ("over-under") combination gun, with a .22 Hornet rifle barrel located above the .410 bore shotgun barrel. It has 14-inch barrels and folds in half to a minimum size of 15 inches. A storage compartment in the stock held nine rounds of .22 Hornet ammunition with four shotgun shells. A firing pin selector allowed the shooter to choose which barrel would be fired. Because most bomber crews operated in the Arctic region during the Cold War, a trigger bar was used that could be depressed while wearing mittens as opposed to a conventional trigger. The M6 was not intended to engage hostile troops, but to enable downed aircrew to forage for wild game and defend themselves from dangerous animals. Its rifle element was considered to be accurate up to 200 yards. Overall weight of the initial version, including stored ammunition, was around three pounds.

== Other versions ==
Springfield M6 Scout

Being a military firearm, the originals were sold only to the US military.

The Springfield Armory M6 Scout is derived from the M6 and was made in three versions, a .22 Hornet over .410 gauge, a .22 Long Rifle over .410 gauge and a .22 Magnum over .410 gauge. The Scouts were also made with 18.25" barrels to comply with the National Firearms Act. The later models had large oversized trigger guards and Picatinny rails for mounting a wide range of sights and scopes.

In 2010, Chiappa began marketing a version of the Aircrew Survival Weapon called the Chiappa M6 Survival Gun. The Chiappa has a 12 gauge shotgun or 20 gauge barrel over a .22 Long Rifle or .22 Magnum barrel. In addition, it comes with "X Caliber" adapters sleeves that fit inside the 12 gauge barrel allowing it to fire: .380 ACP, 9mm Luger, .38 Special, .357 Magnum, .40 S&W, .44 Special, .44 Magnum, .45 ACP, .45 Long Colt, .410 bore and 20 gauge ammunition. It has a similar appearance to the original M6, however it's a unique design that uses a skeletonized metal buttstock that surrounds a polypropylene foam insert. It also uses double triggers and an enclosed firing mechanism.

In 2019, a version began to be produced by TPS Arms. While very similar to the Springfield version, it added a cross bolt safety and removed the hammer selector safety.

== See also ==
- M30 Luftwaffe drilling
- Marble Game Getter
- TP-82, a survival pistol for cosmonauts
