= Alofs Reloading Magazine =

Shotgun magazine attachment

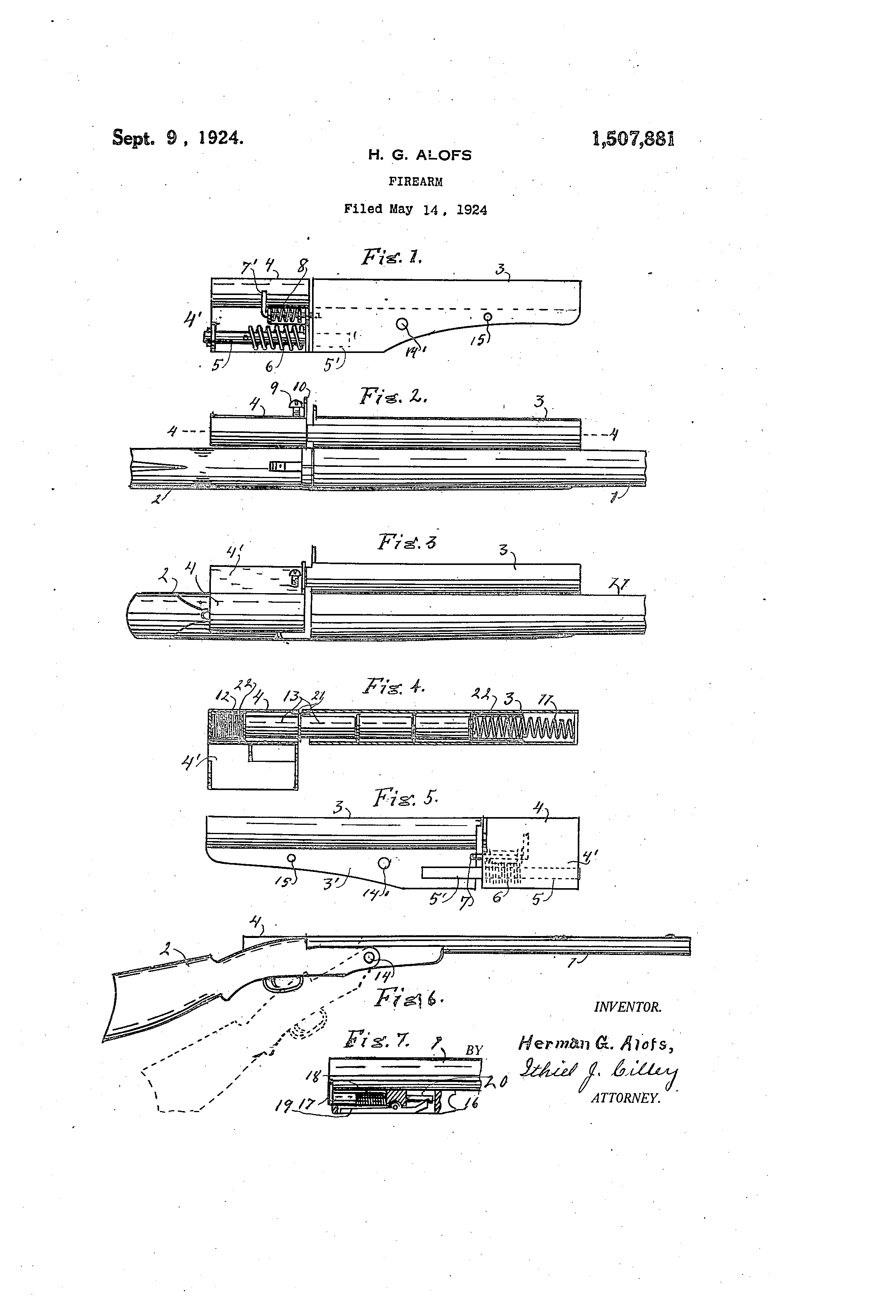
- Place of origin: United States

Production history
- Designer: Herman Alofs
- Designed: 1924
- Manufacturer: Alofs Manufacturing Company
- Developed into: Sülün Arms ST-601 shotgun
- Produced: 1925–1930s

The Alofs Reloading Magazine was an accessory made to be bolted onto single-shot break-action shotguns. It was intended to transform the shotgun into a repeater. It was designed by Herman Alofs in 1924 and manufactured by Alofs Manufacturing Company.

== History ==
The Alofs Reloading Magazine was designed in 1924, and patented in the same year, with the intention of converting a single-shot break-action shotgun into an inexpensive, repeating shotgun. It was sold for $6 each and advertised in 12, 16, 20, and .410 gauges, though due to their lack of appeal in gauges other than 12 gauge there may be no surviving examples other than in 12 gauge. The Alofs shotgun was produced until the 1930s.

The Alofs Manufacturing Company declared bankruptcy in 1996.

== Design details ==
The Alofs Reloading Magazine is designed around a storage magazine that is connected to the firearm's barrel, and a transfer magazine, both of which are connected via a supporting rod.

In operation, once the user breaks open the gun and a shell is ejected, the Alofs Reloading Magazine's loaded transfer magazine places a new shell in alignment to the weapon's chamber. It engages a spring within the tubular magazine. Upon closing the shotgun, this spring pushes a new shell into the transfer magazine's chamber.
