= 9.3×74mmR =

Rifle cartridge

9.3×74R
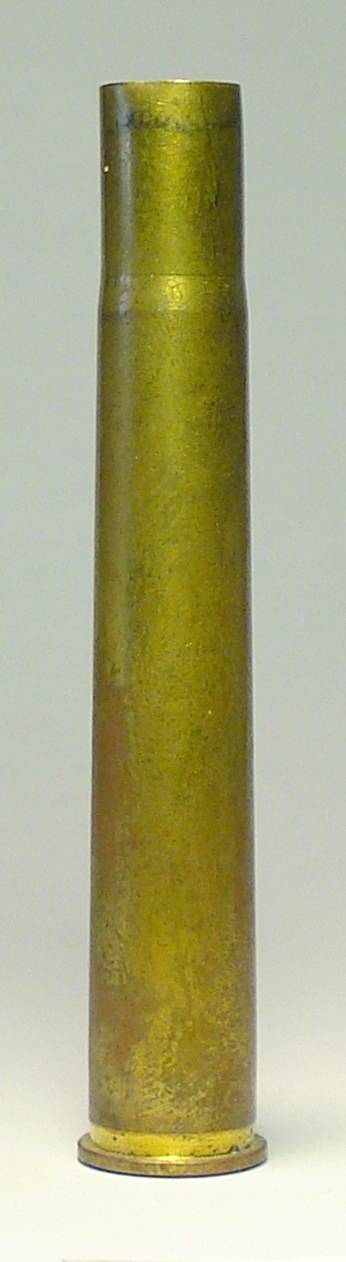
- 9.3×74mmR casing
- Type: Rifle
- Place of origin: Germany

Production history
- Designed: c. 1900
- Produced: c. 1900–present

Specifications
- Case type: Rimmed, bottleneck
- Bullet diameter: 9.30 mm (0.366 in)
- Neck diameter: 9.92 mm (0.391 in)
- Shoulder diameter: 10.40 mm (0.409 in)
- Base diameter: 11.90 mm (0.469 in)
- Rim diameter: 13.35 mm (0.526 in)
- Rim thickness: 1.40 mm (0.055 in)
- Case length: 74.70 mm (2.941 in)
- Overall length: 94.50 mm (3.720 in)
- Case capacity: 5.39 cm^{3} (83.2 gr H_{2}O)
- Rifling twist: 360 mm (1-14.2")
- Primer type: Large rifle
- Maximum pressure (C.I.P.): 340.00 MPa (49,313 psi)

Ballistic performance
| Bullet mass/type | Velocity | Energy |
|---|---|---|
| 230 gr (15 g) Norma Ecostrike | 2,559 ft/s (780 m/s) | 3,345 ft⋅lbf (4,535 J) |
| 247 gr (16 g) KS | 2,460 ft/s (750 m/s) | 3,319 ft⋅lbf (4,500 J) |
| 285 gr (18 g) Norma Oryx | 2,329 ft/s (710 m/s) | 3,434 ft⋅lbf (4,656 J) |
- Test barrel length: 610 millimetres (24 in); Source: Norma

9.3×74mm R (designated as the 9,3 x 74 R by the C.I.P.) is a medium-bore cartridge designed in Germany around 1900.

== Design ==
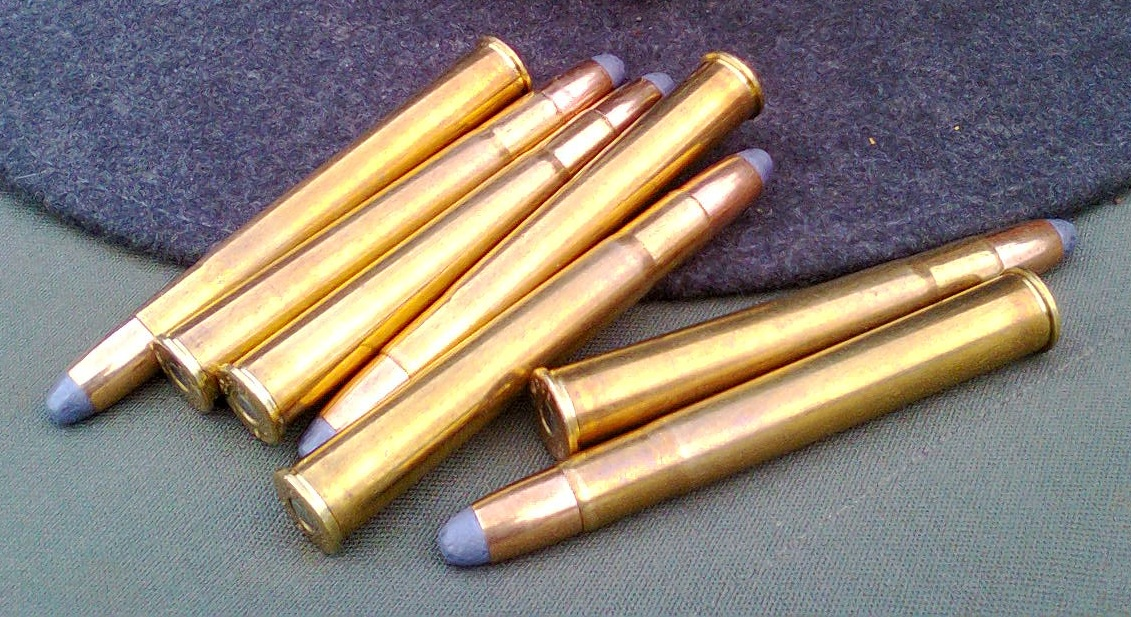
9.3×74mmR cartridges

The 9.3×74mmR is of a rimmed, bottleneck design and uses a .366-inch (9.3 mm) diameter bullet, usually weighing 286-grain (18.5 g). According to Hornady, at this weight the velocity is 2,362 ft/s (720 m/s) and energy is 3,536 ft⋅lbf (4,794 J). This cartridge is used for hunting medium to large game animals and is very popular in Europe for wild boar. It remains a popular cartridge for African safari hunting in countries with more German influence like Namibia, favored as a continental alternative to the more popular .375 H&H Magnum. Outside Europe, Ruger formerly produced the Ruger No. 1 falling-block rifle in this cartridge, but have currently discontinued production of any rifles in this caliber.

The cartridge is a popular chambering for double rifles and combination guns in Germany, and is a favourite for many European hunters; having been described as the "queen of deer cartridges". An M30 Luftwaffe Drilling, manufactured by J.P. Sauer & Sohn in this chambering, was issued for use by downed German pilots as a survival weapon for hunting and self-defense purposes, while serving in the North African campaign during World War II.

== See also ==
- 9.3×64mm Brenneke
- List of rimmed cartridges
- List of rifle cartridges
- 9 mm caliber
- Table of handgun and rifle cartridges
