= OF-9 =

OF-9 can refer to

- A grade on the Uniformed services pay grades of the United States
- A rank grade of the standard rank scale used within NATO
- A russian break action shotgun called the OF-93

== See also ==
- The Wave OF9, 2022 EP by K-pop band SF9
