= M30 Luftwaffe Drilling =

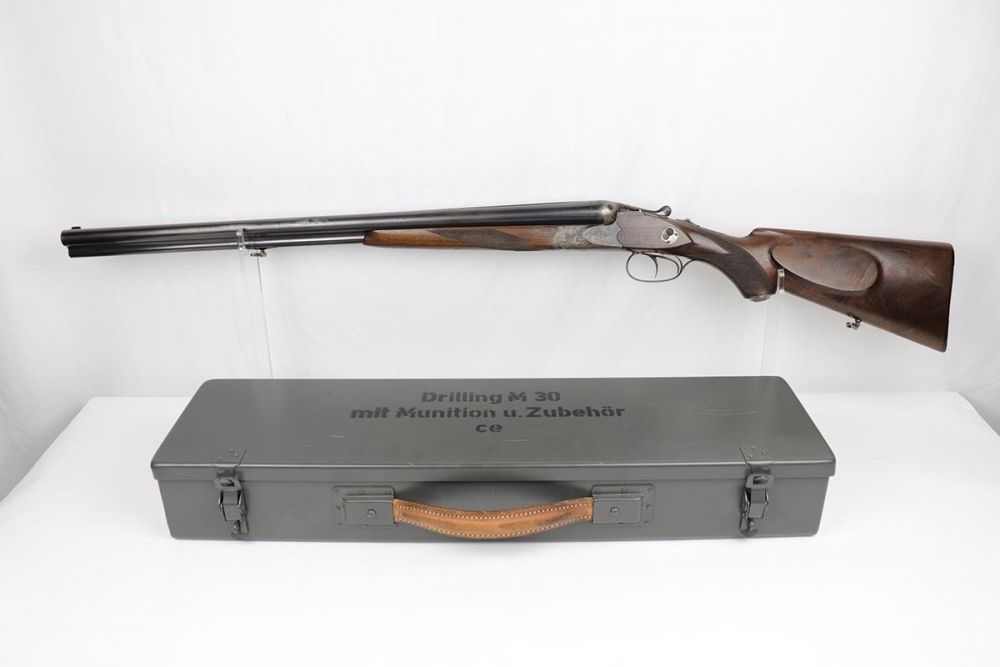
- Type: Combination rifle/shotgun
- Place of origin: Nazi Germany

Service history
- Wars: World War II

Production history
- Manufacturer: Sauer & Sohn
- Produced: 1941–1942
- No. built: ~2,456

Specifications
- Mass: 7.5 lb (3.4 kg)
- Length: 42 in (1,100 mm)
- Barrel length: 25.625 in (650.9 mm)
- Cartridge: 9.3x74mmR, 12/65 Gauge
- Barrels: 3
- Action: Blitz lock system
- Feed system: Manually loaded
- Sights: Fixed

The M30 Luftwaffe Drilling ("triple") was a combination gun issued to Luftwaffe pilots during World War II. Intended to be used as a survival weapon for hunting and self-defense against a variety of natural predators, the M30 was used by airmen operating in Northern Africa.

For maximum versatility the M30 Luftwaffe Drilling featured two side-by-side 12 gauge shotgun barrels on top and a 9.3x74mmR rifle barrel below. The left-hand barrel was left unchoked for shooting slugs and the right barrel was choked for shooting birdshot. They were manufactured by the German firm J. P. Sauer und Sohn GmbH.

== History ==
The M30 was produced by JP Sauer & Sohn, at the time the most finely finished and luxurious survival rifle ever issued by a military force. The commercial quality of the M30 Drilling, the fact that its container and accessories were packed without military acceptance proofs, its limited production and high manufacturing costs, led many historians and arms collectors to conclude that the M30 Luftwaffe Drilling was not routinely issued to Luftwaffe pilots. The head of the Luftwaffe, Hermann Göring, was an avid hunter who often hosted guests at his elaborate hunting lodge, the Carinhall. The M30 Luftwaffe Drilling was possibly ordered through the Luftwaffe by Göring, to be used as gifts for visiting dignitaries, Knight's Cross holders, Luftwaffe aces, Wehrmacht generals, Nazi officials, and other guests who were invited to his hunting lodge. Luftwaffe general and flying ace Adolf Galland recalled that he and several of his squadron mates were gifted the M30 Luftwaffe Drilling during hunting trips with Göring at the Carinhall.

The M30 saw use by the Luftwaffe in World War II, primarily during the North African campaign, where it was used as a survival weapon by some Luftwaffe aircrews. It was also used for trap shooting, which was an exercise used by aircrew to sharpen the eyesight and reflexes of Luftwaffe pilots during obligatory training.

Its powerful 9.3x74mmR cartridge, ballistically similar to .375 Flanged Nitro Express, was best suited for Sub-Saharan African plains hunting, even though it was mostly used by pilots flying over North Africa, where dangerous fauna are less common. Various reasons have been provided for this gratuitous cartridge, one of which being a mistaken assumption that there were big cats in the region where these firearms would be used. Another reason given is Hermann Göring's personal fondness for hunting, especially for luxurious rifles.

The original production model had been marketed to hunters starting in 1930, and the military iteration of the M30 was produced from 1941 to 1942. They were procured outside of normal military channels. The military versions were made to the same standards of fit and finish as the commercial version, making the M30 extremely expensive.

The M30 was stored in an aluminium chest on board the aircraft, containing the weapon disassembled into barrel assembly and stock, a sling and cleaning kit, 20 rounds of 9.3x74mmR ammunition, 20 12-gauge slug shells and 25 12-gauge birdshot shells. The whole chest weighed 15 kilograms (32 lb), and was intended to be retrieved from the aircraft after it crashed rather than taken as the crew bailed out.

== Design ==
The weapon has two hammered shotgun barrels with a single rifle barrel underneath, firing two 12 gauge or 16 gauge shotgun shells (16 gauge seems to have only been used on the commercial version) alongside a single 9.3×74mmR rifle round. The M30 has two triggers and a sliding selector directly behind the lever for opening the breech. With the selector in the forward position, the 100 m (110 yd) V-notch rear sight is raised and the forward trigger engaged. In this mode, the front trigger fires the rifle barrel while the rear trigger fires the left shotgun barrel, which is choked for Brenneke slugs. Sliding the selector back retracts the rear sight and makes the front trigger fire the right shotgun barrel, which is choked for birdshot. This setup is common for Drillings, this allows the weapon to fire three shots without either opening the breech or lowering the weapon from the shoulder.

== In Media ==
Seen in the games:

- Battlefield V
- theHunter
- Enlisted (video game) (not a realistic depiction as the player is only able to use the shotgun aspect of the gun)
- Call of Duty: WWII
- Forgotten Hope 2
- Sniper Elite Series
- Zombie Army 4: Dead War (fictional modification replacing the rifle barrel with a third shotgun barrel)
- Hunt Showdown: 1896 (Also features a 'sawed-off'/shorty variant)

== See also ==
- List of multiple-barrel firearms
- M6 Aircrew Survival Weapon
- Marble Game Getter – Combination gun
- TP-82 Cosmonaut survival pistol – Combination gun carried by cosmonauts on Soviet space missions
- Chiappa Triple Crown
