= Survival kit =

Emergency equipment

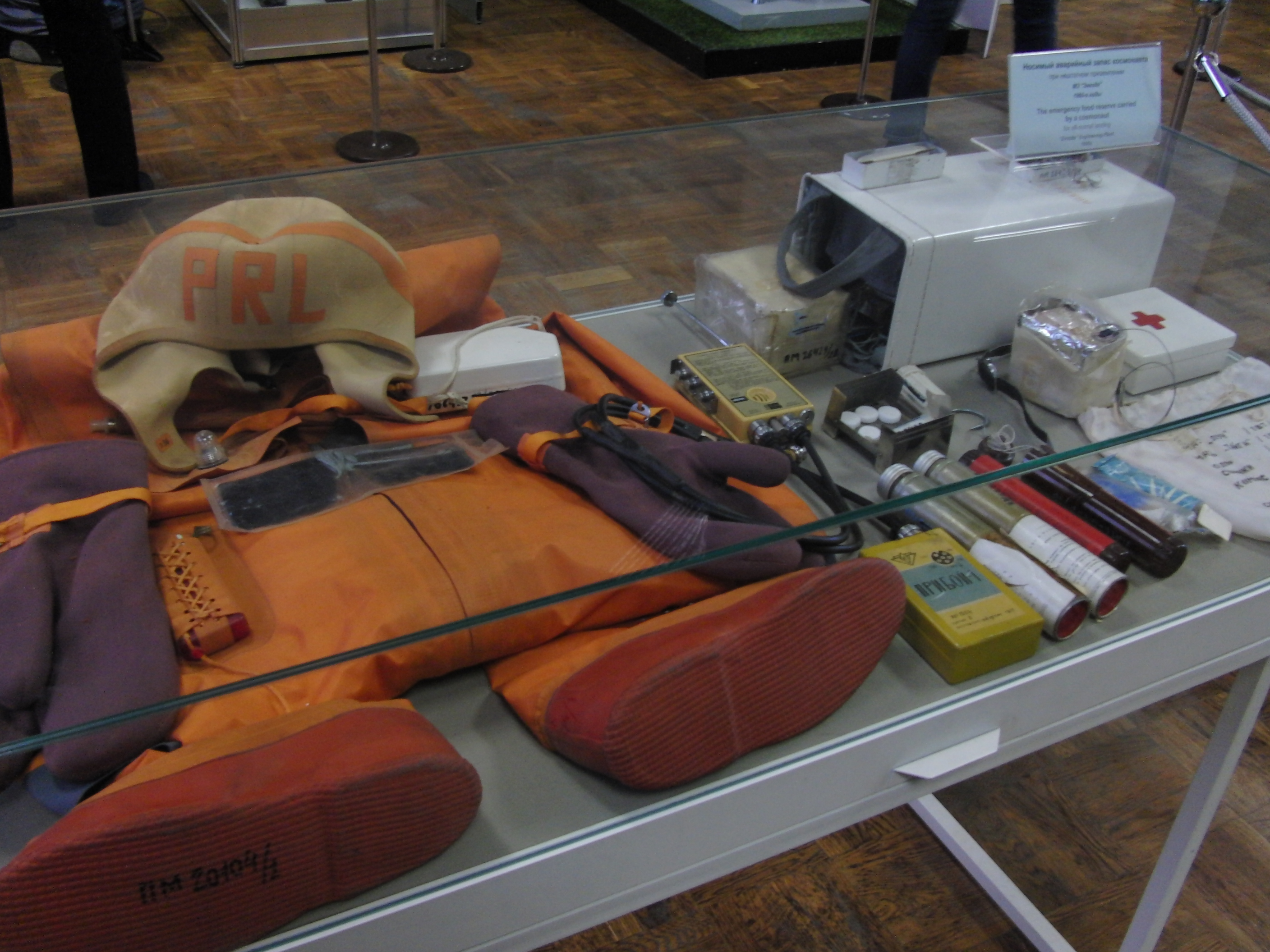
Cosmonaut's survival kit in Polytechnical Museum, Moscow

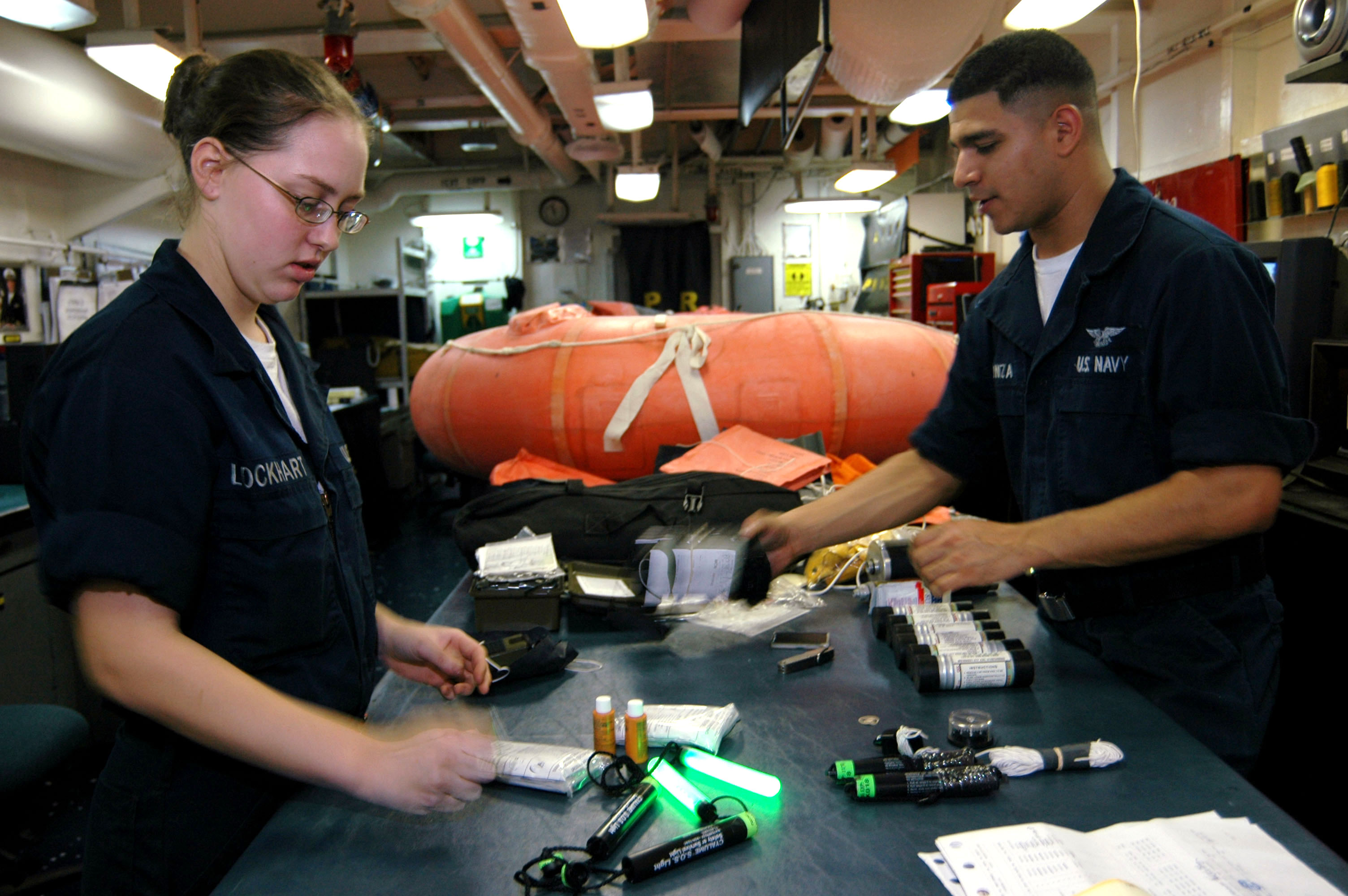
Sailors take inventory of a C-2A Greyhound's liferaft kit in USS Kitty Hawk (CV 63) paraloft shop.

A survival kit is a package of basic tools and supplies prepared as an aid to survival in an emergency. Civil and military aircraft, lifeboats, and spacecraft are equipped with survival kits.

Survival kits, in a variety of sizes, contain supplies and tools to provide a survivor with basic shelter against the elements, help them to keep warm, meet basic health and first aid needs, provide food and water, signal to rescuers, and assist in finding the way back to help. Supplies in a survival kit normally include a knife (often a Swiss army knife or a multi-tool), matches, tinder, first aid kit, bandana, fish hooks, sewing kit, and a flashlight.

Civilians such as forestry workers, surveyors, or bush pilots, who work in remote locations or in regions with extreme climate conditions, may also be equipped with survival kits. Disaster supplies are also kept on hand by those who live in areas prone to earthquakes or other natural disasters. For the average citizen to practice disaster preparedness, some towns will have survival stores to keep survival supplies in stock.

The American Red Cross recommends an emergency preparedness kit that is easy to carry and use in the event of an emergency or disaster.

== Types of survival kits ==
=== Mini survival kits ===
Mini survival kits or "Altoids" tin survival kits are small kits that contain a few basic survival tools. These kits often include a small compass, waterproof matches, minimum fishing tackle, large plastic bag, small candle, jigsaw blade, craft knife or scalpel blade, and/or a safety pin/s. Pre-packaged survival kits may also include instructions in survival techniques such as fire-starting or first aid methods. In addition, paracord can be wrapped around the tin. The paracord can be used for setting up an emergency shelter or snaring small animals. They are designed to fit within a container roughly the size of a mint tin.

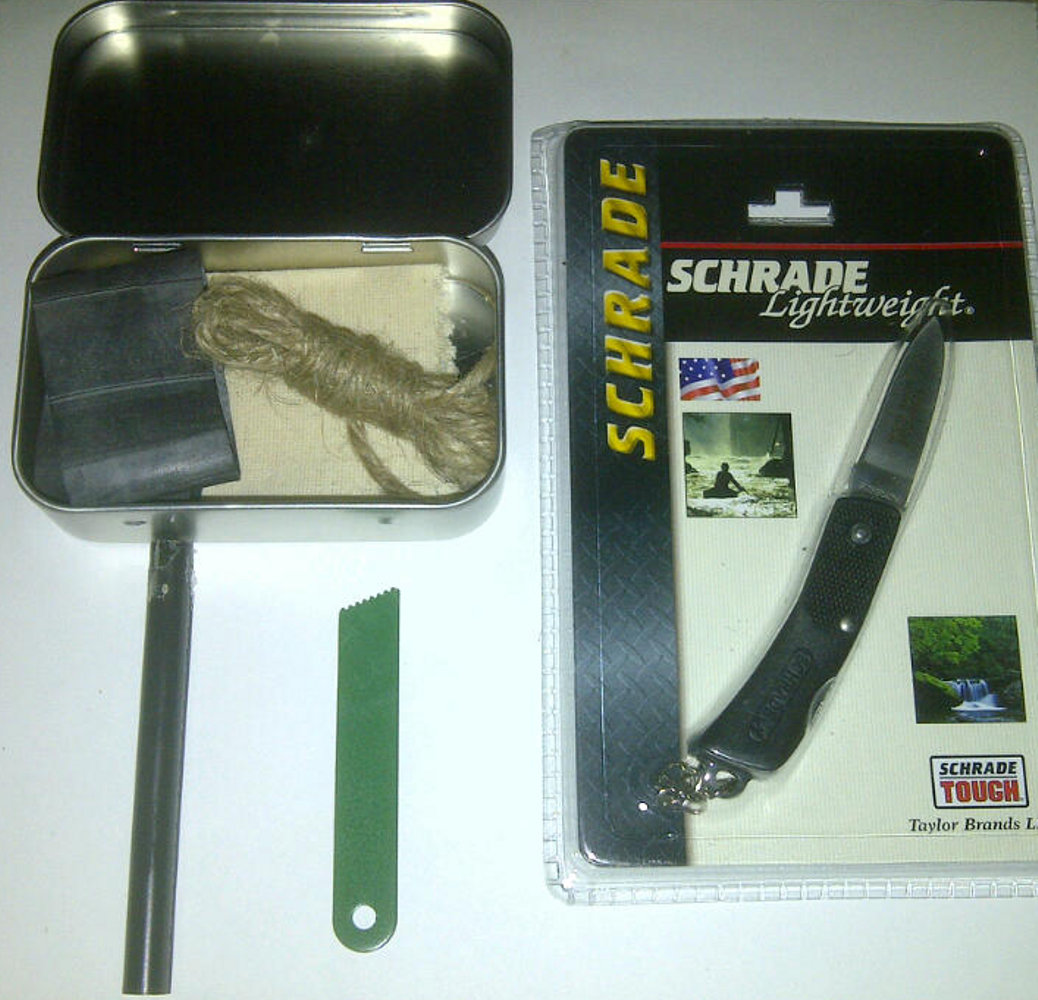
Fire-making kit contained in tin

Other small kits are wearable and built into everyday carry survival bracelets or belts. Most often these are paracord bracelets with tools woven inside. Several tools such as firestarter, buckles, whistles and compass are on the exterior of the gear and smaller tools are woven inside the jewelry or belt and only accessible by taking the bracelet apart.

Lightweight survival kits are generally seen as a backup means of survival; however, these kits can be extensive, and have come to include tools that are generally found in larger kits as survival technology advances. Some examples of these tools are high-power flashlights, rapid use saws, signal devices such as mini signal mirrors, and water purification methods.

=== Emergency kit ===
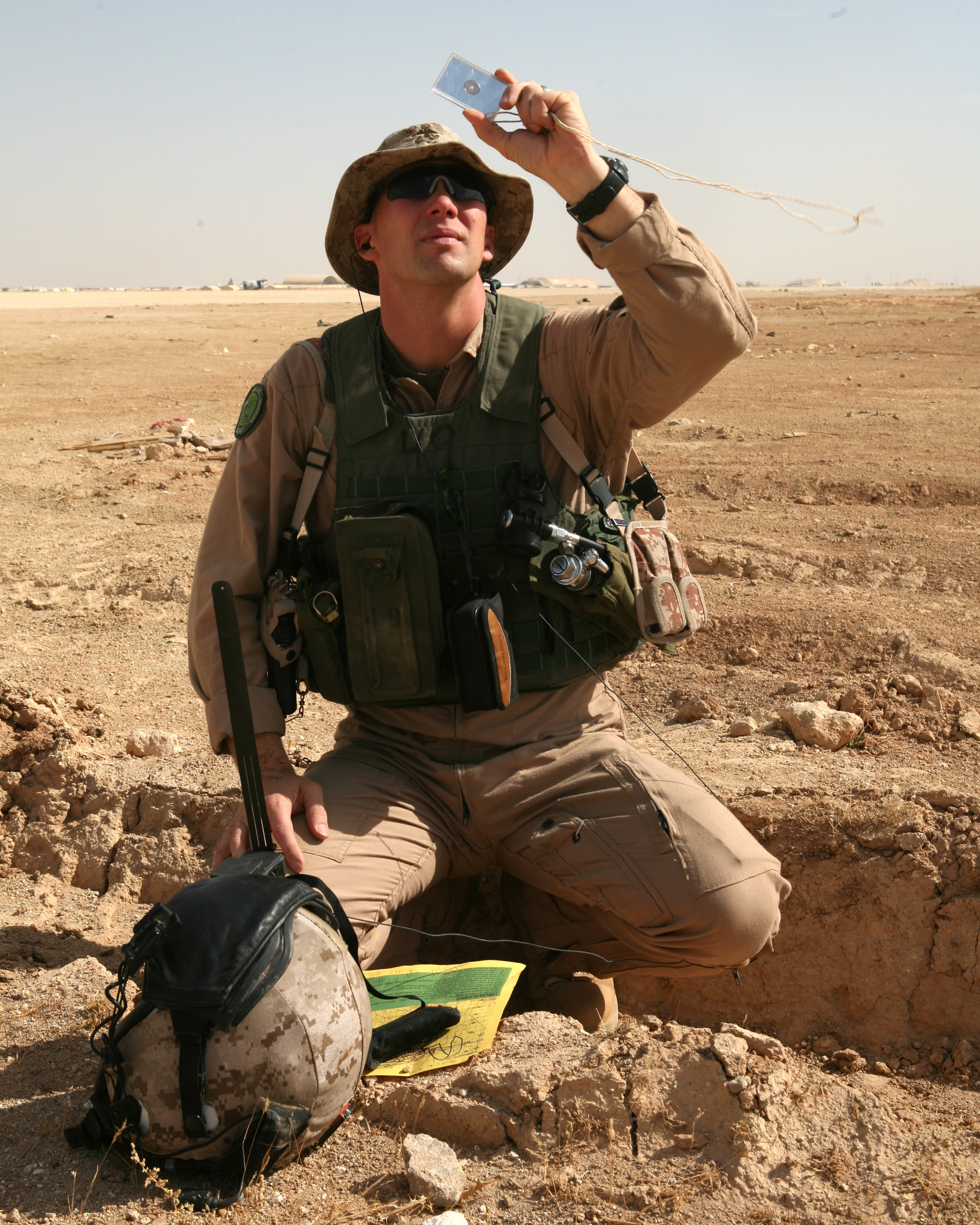
A U.S. Marine signalling an aircraft with a signal mirror

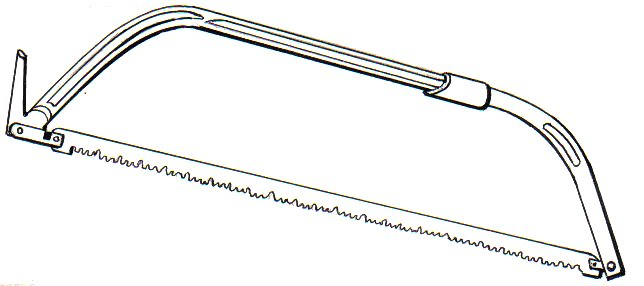
Bow saws about 24 inches (61 cm) in length are lightweight and fast-cutting.

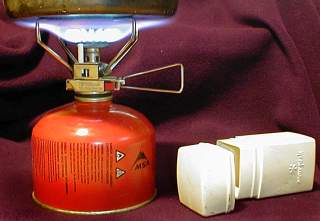
A small Snow Peak portable stove running on MSR gas and the stove's carrying case

An emergency kit, disaster bag, bug-out bag (BOB), also known as a 72-hour kit, GOOD bag (get out of Dodge), personal emergency relocation kit (PERK), go-bag, survival backpack, or quick run bag (QRB) is a portable kit containing items that would help a person to survive for 72 hours during an escape or evacuation from an emergency event or disaster such as a hurricane, earthquake, or flood.

The focus is on evacuation rather than long-term survival. The kits are also popular in the survivalism subculture.

==== Civil defense kit ====
A typical 3-day (72 hour) civil defense emergency kit contains:

- Water
- Non-perishable food
- Necessary medicines
- A battery-powered radio
- A torch
- Cash
- Identity documents
- A first-aid kit
- A Swiss Army knife
- Clothing
- Toiletries
- Bottled water
- Portable chargers

==== Outline ====
The term "bug-out bag" is related to the "bail-out bag" emergency kit many military aviators carry. In the United States, the term refers to the Korean War practice of the U.S. Army designating alternative defensive positions, in the event that the units had to retreat. They were directed to "bug out" when being overrun was imminent. The term has since been adopted by military training institutions around the world, with standard operating procedures involving a bug-out location, a method of withdrawal, and the bare supplies needed to withdraw quickly but still survive in the field. The concept passed into wide usage among other military and law enforcement personnel, though the "bail-out bag" is as likely to include emergency gear for going into an emergency situation as for escaping during one.

The primary purpose of a bug-out bag is to allow someone to evacuate quickly if a disaster should strike. It is therefore prudent to gather into a single place all of the materials and supplies that might be required to do this, such as a bag or a few storage containers. The recommendation that a bug-out bag contain enough supplies for 72 hours arises from advice from organizations responsible for disaster relief and management that it may take them up to 72 hours to reach people affected by a disaster and offer help. The bag's contents may vary according to the region of the user, as someone evacuating from the path of a hurricane may have different supplies from someone who lives in an area prone to blizzards, earthquakes, or wildfires.

In addition to allowing one to survive a disaster evacuation, a bug-out bag may also be used when sheltering in place ("bugging in") as a response to emergencies such as blackouts, house fires, tornadoes, and other severe natural disasters.

=== Typical contents ===
The Federal Emergency Management Agency (FEMA), the United States's agency responsible for disaster planning and emergency resource management, outlines the following list for a three-day basic emergency supply kit. Similar items can also be found from other national emergency response agencies.

The suggested contents of a bug-out bag vary and can also include weapons for defense from dangerous animals or people.

- Water (one gallon per person per day for at least three days, for drinking and sanitation)
- Food (at least a three-day supply of non-perishable food)
- Battery-powered or hand crank radio and a NOAA Weather Radio with tone alert
- Flashlight
- First aid kit
- Extra batteries
- Whistle (to signal for help)
- Dust mask (to help filter contaminated air)
- Plastic sheeting and duct tape (to shelter in place)
- Wet wipes, garbage bags and plastic ties (for personal sanitation)
- Wrench or pliers (to turn off utilities)
- Manual can opener (for food)
- Local maps
- Cell phone with chargers and a backup battery

==== Additional emergency supplies ====
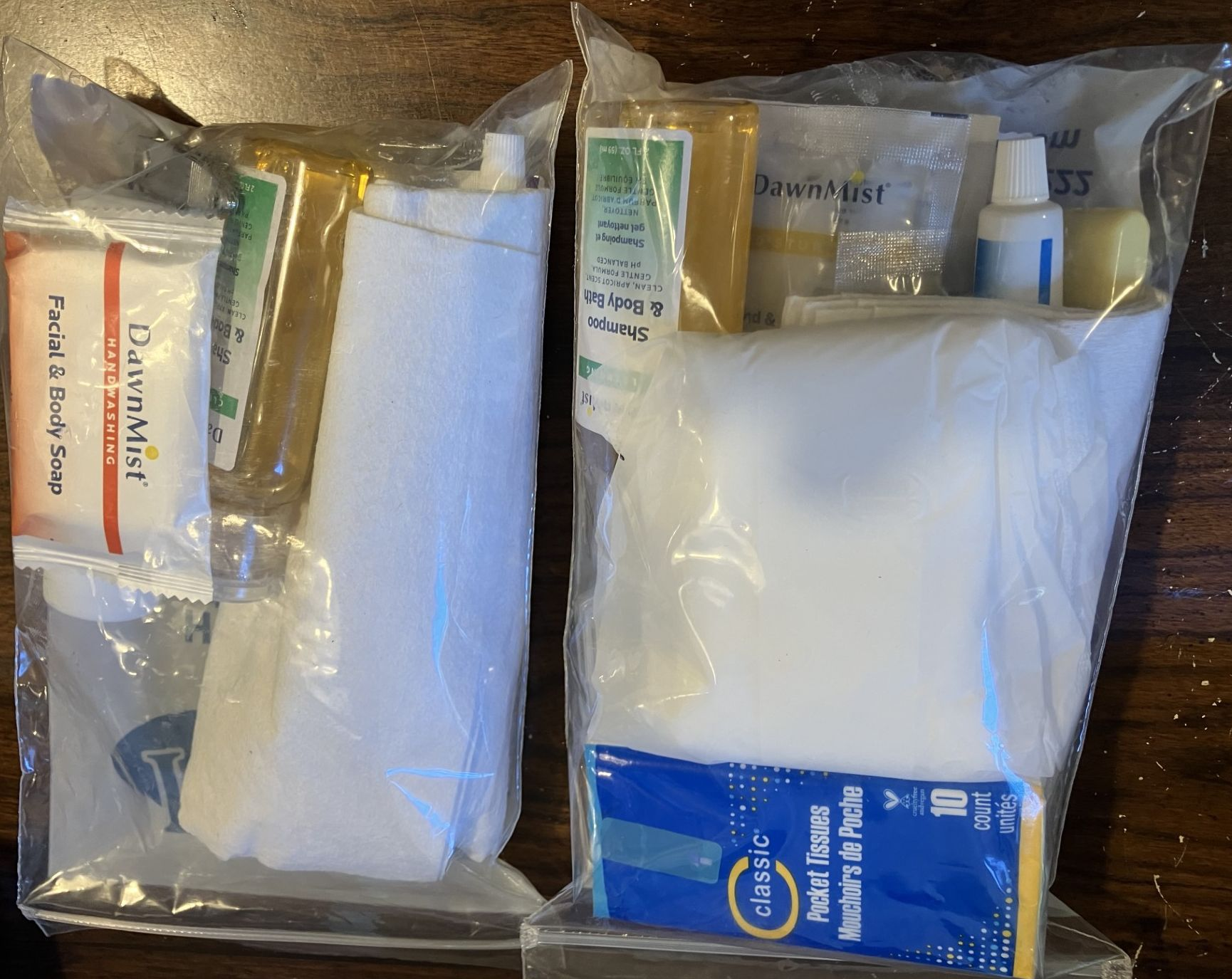
Emergency hygiene kits, men and women variants

Since spring 2020, the Centers for Disease Control and Prevention (CDC) has recommended people include additional items in their kits to help prevent the spread of coronavirus or other viruses and the flu.

- Masks (for everyone ages two and above), soap, hand sanitizer, disinfecting wipes to disinfect surfaces
- Prescription medications
- Non-prescription medications such as pain relievers, anti-diarrhea medication, antacids or laxatives
- Prescription eyeglasses and contact lens solution
- Infant formula, bottles, diapers, wipes and diaper rash cream
- Pet food and extra water
- Cash or traveler's checks
- Important family documents such as copies of insurance policies, identification and bank account records saved electronically or in a waterproof, portable container
- Sleeping bag or warm blanket for each person
- Complete climate-appropriate change of clothing and sturdy shoes
- Fire extinguisher
- Matches in a waterproof container
- Feminine supplies and personal hygiene items
- Mess kits, paper cups, plates, paper towels and utensils
- Paper and pencil
- Books, games, puzzles or other activities for children

=== Lifeboat survival kits ===
Lifeboat survival kits are stowed in inflatable or rigid lifeboats or life rafts. These kits provide basic survival tools and supplies to enable passengers to survive until they are rescued. A lifeboat survival kit for six people can include:

- Drinking water (9 litres)
- emergency rations (3 kg)
- first aid kit
- 36 anti-seasickness tablets
- 1 bailer
- 2 sponges
- 6 sickness bags
- 2 thermal survival blankets
- 1 bellows or pump
- 3 leak stoppers
- 2 bottles of sunscreen
- 6 drinking cups
- 1 fishing kit
- 1 sea anchor and line
- 1 pair of scissors
- 1 repair kit
- 2 parachute rockets
- 3–6 hand flares
- 2 flashlights with extra batteries and bulbs
- 1 whistle
- 1 signaling mirror
- 1 smoke signal
- survival instructions
- table of life-saving signals

=== Military kits ===
Survival kits for military aviators are often modified according to the environment of operations:

- In desert areas, survival kits may have more water and sunscreen, and have additional items such as shade hats, a compass, a whistle, medical equipment, tinder, matches, and sun glasses.
- In tropical areas, a survival kit may have mosquito head netting, additional insect repellent, anti-fungal cream, a machete, water purification tablets, foot powder, matches, a flint strike, a compass, a wire saw, a space blanket, medical equipment (gauze pads, elastic gauze bandage, antiseptic creams, anti-malaria tablets, anti-infection tablets, bandages, etc.), salt tablets, a fishing kit, snare wire, extra socks, a candle, a signal mirror, flares, a sewing kit, safety pins, tinder, tape, a whistle, and rations.
- In arctic or alpine areas, survival kits may have additional cold weather clothing (winter hats and gloves), sleeping bags, chemical "hand warmer" packets, sunglasses/snow goggles, snowshoes, a collapsible shovel, a snare wire for small animals, a frying pan, a camp stove, camp stove fuel, a space blanket, matches, a whistle, a compass, tinder, medical equipment, a flint strike, a wire saw, extra socks and a tent designed for arctic use.
- For personnel who are flying over large bodies of water, in addition to wearing a survival suit over cold water, a survival kit may have additional items such as a small self-inflating raft to get the aircrewman out of cold or predator infested waters, flotation vests, sea anchor, fishing nets, fishing equipment, fluorescent sea marking dye, pyrotechnical signals, a survival radio and/or radio-beacon, formerly a distress marker light replaced by a flashing strobe, formerly a seawater still or chemical desalinator kit now replaced by a hand-pumped reverse osmosis desalinator (MROD) for desalinating seawater, a raft repair kit, a paddle, a bailer and sponge, sunscreen, medical equipment, a whistle, a compass, and a sun shade hat.

The U.S. Army uses several basic survival kits, mainly for aviators, some of which are stored in carrying bags. Aviators in planes with ejection seats have survival kits in a vest and the seat pan. The survival vest worn by US helicopter crews also contains some basic survival items.

=== Spacecraft kits ===
Astronauts are provided with survival kits due to the difficulty of predicting where a spacecraft will land on its return to Earth, especially in the case of an equipment failure. In early US space flights, the kit was optimised for survival at sea; the one provided for John Glenn on the first American orbital space flight in Friendship 7 contained "a life raft, pocket knife, signaling mirror, shark repellent, seawater desalting tablets, sunscreen, soap, first aid kit, and other items". A survival kit was provided for the Apollo program which was "...designed to provide a 48-hour postlanding (water or land) survival capability for three crewmen between 40 degrees North and South latitudes". It contained "a survival radio, a survival light assembly, desalter kits, a machete, sunglasses, water cans, sun lotion, a blanket, a pocket knife, netting and foam pads".

The kits provided for Soviet and Russian cosmonauts are optimised for survival in the temperate and sub-arctic mountains, forests and grasslands in the east of the country. Soyuz spacecraft kits include "food rations, water bottles, warm clothing, rope for making a shelter using the capsule's parachute, fish hooks and miscellaneous other survival gear". The TP-82 Cosmonaut survival pistol, was provided to defend against predators such as wolves or bears. It was able to fire conventional bullets, shotgun cartridges and flares; the folding stock could be used as a shovel and it also had a fold-out machete.

=== Vehicle kits ===
Another aspect of some preparedness plans are vehicle kits. In some cases, supplies and equipment may be loaded into vehicle such as a van or truck with bicycle racks and a reserve gas tank. Some survivalists also carry a small (e.g., 250 cc) off-road-capable motorcycle in the van or truck.

Food supplies in a bug-out vehicle include hundreds of pounds of wheat, rice, and beans, and enough honey, powdered milk, canned goods, bottled fruit, vitamins, dehydrated fruits and vegetables, salt, pepper, spices, and oil for several months. In addition, the kits often contain high-calorie energy bars, a cooking kit, utensils, liquid soap, and towels. The water supplies may include bottled water, filtering kit, bottles, collapsible water containers, and chlorine bleach for water purification. Food preparation and washing equipment may include items such as a grain grinder, a bread mixer, a strainer, a manual can opener, a steam canner with canning jars and O-rings, cutlery, knives, an electric 12-volt cooler icebox, kerosene lamps and heaters, kerosene or propane stoves, extra fuel, a clothes wringer, a foot-operated treadle sewing machine, and an electric hot plate (which would require an inverter to operate off a car battery).

The medical supplies may include a blood pressure gauge, stethoscope, scissors, tweezers, forceps, disposable scalpels, two thermometers (oral and rectal), inflatable splints, bandages, sutures, adhesive tape, gauze, burn ointment, antibiotic ointment, aspirin, rubbing alcohol, ipecac syrup, sterile water, cotton rags, soap, and cotton swabs.

The transportation items may include bicycles with off-road tires and suspension, emergency tools and spare auto parts (e.g., fuses, fan belts, light bulbs, head light, tire pump, etc.), and an inflatable raft with paddles.

In addition, the kits may contain typical individual "survival kit" items, such as nylon tarps, extra clothes and coats, blankets, sleeping bags, matches or other fire starting equipment, a compass and maps, flashlights, toilet paper, soap, a pocketknife and bowie knife, a fishing kit, a portable camping stove, a power inverter, backpack, paper and pencil, a signaling mirror, whistle, cable saw, bleach, insect repellent, magnifying glass, rope and nylon cord, pulleys, and a pistol and ammunition.

The communications equipment may include a multi-band receiver/scanner, a citizens band (CB) radio, portable "walkie-talkies" with rechargeable batteries, and a portable battery-powered television. The power supplies may include a diesel or gasoline generator with a one-month fuel supply, an auto battery and charger, extension cord, flashlights, rechargeable batteries (with recharger), an electric multimeter, and a test light. Defense items include a revolver, semi-automatic pistol, rifle, shotgun, ammunition, mace or pepper spray, and a large knife such as a KA-BAR or a bowie knife.

Tools may include cutting tools such as saws, axes and hatchets; mechanical advantage aids such as a pry bar or wrecking bar, ropes, pulleys, or a 'come-a-long" hand-operated winch; construction tools such as pliers, chisels, a hammer, screwdrivers, a hand-operated twist drill, vise grip pliers, glue, nails, nuts, bolts, and screws; mechanical repair tools such as an arc welder, an oxy-acetylene torch, a propane torch with a spark lighter, a solder iron and flux, wrench set, a nut driver, a tap and die set, a socket set, and a fire extinguisher. As well, some survivalists bring barterable items such as fishing line, liquid soap, insect repellent, light bulbs, can openers, extra fuels, motor oil, and ammunition.

=== Get me home kit ===
Some survivalists also recommend keeping a get me home kit in the car and/or at work. This is a kit to enable a person to get back home from work in an emergency where all transport cars and public transport have broken down. It is designed around personal circumstances where, for example, a walk of 25 kilometres might be required from work to home. The get me home kit can include, for example, enough water to get home, suitable walking shoes, a map (not electronic), enough food for 12 hours, clothing for adverse weather, etc.

=== Go-bag ===
The term go-kit / go-bags is popular in the amateur radio service, especially in the Amateur Radio Emergency Service (ARES) and Radio Amateur Civil Emergency Service (RACES) communities, and describes a combination personal bug-out bag and portable amateur radio station. A personal go-kit generally takes some combination of units: a "one-day" (or "24 hour") kit, a "three day" (or "72 hour") kit that adds additional supplies, or a "one week kit" that adds yet additional personal items to the three-day kit. Any or all supports deploying the operator plus his or her privately owned self-contained radio communications setup.

== See also ==
- Civil Defense
- Community Emergency Response Team
- Hiking equipment
- M30 Luftwaffe Drilling
- M6 aircrew survival weapon
- Machine element
- Mini survival kit
- Retreat (survivalism)
- Red Cross parcel
- Repair kit
- Electrical element
- Electronic component
- List of martial arts weapons
- Lists of weapons
- Ten essentials
- Tool
