= Savage Model 24 =

Savage combination gun

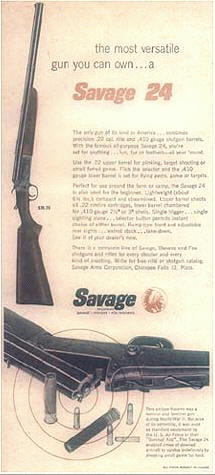
- Advertisement For Savage Model 24 circa 1956
- Type: Break-action combination gun
- Place of origin: United States

Service history
- In service: 1938
- Used by: United States
- Wars: World War II

Production history
- Designer: Stevens Arms
- Designed: 1938
- Manufacturer: Stevens Arms; Savage Arms
- Produced: 1938–2010: 1938–1950 for Stevens Arms; 1950–2010 for Savage Arms
- Variants: Stevens Model 22-410; Savage Model 24; Savage Model 24B; Savage Model 24C; Savage model 24S-E; Savage Model 24V; Savage Model 242

Specifications
- Mass: 7 lb (3.2 kg)
- Length: 41 in (100 cm)
- Barrel length: 24 in (61 cm)
- Cartridge: .22 LR over .410 bore
- Action: Break-action
- Feed system: over & under
- Sights: Iron sights

The Savage Model 24 is an American made over-and-under combination gun manufactured by Savage Arms. The basic .22LR over .410 gauge model weighs 7 pounds, has 24-inch barrels and has an overall length of 41-inches. It may also be disassembled for ease of storage.

== History ==
The Savage Model 24 was actually introduced by Stevens Arms as the Model 22-410 in 1938. (Note: Stevens was purchased by the Savage Arms Company on 1 April 1920, with Stevens operating as a subsidiary of Savage but in a semi-independent status until 1942. This merger made Savage the largest producer of arms in the United States at the time.) During World War II the United States Army Air Corps purchased some 15,000 Model 22-410s for use as survival guns.

In 1950, Stevens stopped making the 22-410, and Savage introduced the same gun as the Model 24. The basic .22LR over .410 gauge model weighs 7 pounds, has 24-inch barrels, and has an overall length of 41 inches. It may also be disassembled for ease of storage. Over its many years of production, it was made in several versions, including a pistol grip model that is only 26 inches long. The upper rifle barrels were chambered not only in .22 LR, but also .22 WMR, .22 Hornet, .222 Rem, .223 Rem, .30-30 WCF, .357 Magnum, and .357 Maximum. The lower shotgun barrels were chambered also for .410 gauge, 20-gauge, and 12-gauge. They came with both wood and plastic stocks that may or may not hold extra ammunition in the butt. They were also sold in a variety of finishes and grades. The Model 24 was discontinued in 2010.

== Design ==
The Stevens and early Savages models have one trigger and an exposed hammer, with a barrel selector on the right side of the receiver (up for the rifle barrel and down for the shotgun barrel) and no manual safety. Later models had the selector on the top of the exposed hammer (forward/down for shotgun barrel and back/up for the rifle barrel) with a cross-bolt hammer-block safety through the receiver.

== Savage Model 242 ==
The Savage Model 242 is virtually identical to the Model 24, except that both barrels are chambered for .410 bore 3" Magnum with full chokes. These guns were manufactured between 1977 and 1981. Like all later Model 24s, it uses a single trigger and single exposed hammer with a barrel selector lever incorporated into the hammer. It also has a checkered stock and a shotgun bead sight.

== Savage Model 42 ==
The Savage Model 42 combo gun was introduced in 2012, as the successor to the Model 24. The Model 42's barrels are 20 inches long, and the upper barrel fires .22 LR or .22 Magnum, while the lower barrel fires .410 gauge shells. It features black plastic furniture and the adjustable rifle sights can be removed to install a scope base. In 2016, Savage Arms introduced the Model 42 "Takedown" model which breaks down with the push of one button.

== Savage Model 2400 ==
The Savage Model 2400 was made by Valmet of Finland and imported by Savage from 1975 to 1980. It is a completely new design and has little in common with the Model 24. The 2400 features a Superposed hammerless design with a single trigger. The fire selector was a small push button on the upper part of the trigger. They came in 12 gauge (2 3/4" only) over .308 Win or 12 Gauge (2 3/4" only) over .222 Rem.

== Savage Model 389 ==
The Savage Model 389 is an Italian combo gun made for Savage from 1988 to 1990. Like the 2400 it also features a Superposed hammerless design. However, the 389 has two triggers and came in 12 gauge (3" Magnum) over .308 Win or 12 Gauge (3" Magnum) over .222 Rem.

== See also ==
- Chiappa Double Badger
