= Chiappa M6 survival gun =

Combination gun

Chiappa M6 survival rifle
- Type: Combination gun
- Place of origin: Italy

Production history
- Designed: 2010
- Manufacturer: Chiappa Firearms
- Unit cost: $729 USD (MSRP as of 2018)
- Variants: 12 gauge over .22 LR; 12 gauge over .22 Magnum; 20 gauge over .22 LR; 20 gauge over .22 Magnum

Specifications
- Mass: 5.8 lbs
- Length: 34.6" overall 18.5" folded
- Barrel length: 18.5"
- Cartridge: 12 gauge over .22 LR
- Barrels: 2
- Action: break action
- Sights: Iron sights and Picatinny rails

The Chiappa M6 survival gun is an over-and-under combination gun that comes in four versions; 12 gauge over .22 LR, 12 gauge over .22 WMR, 20 gauge over .22 LR, and 20 gauge over .22 WMR. It has a similar appearance to the original M6 aircrew survival weapon, with a skeletonized metal buttstock surrounding a polypropylene foam insert. It uses double triggers and an enclosed firing mechanism.

The M6 is also available with "X Caliber" adapter sleeves that fit inside the shotgun barrels, allowing it to fire a wide range of handgun, rifle, and shotgun ammunition.

== Design ==
The Chiappa M6 is marketed to "outdoorsmen, ranchers, pilots or anyone who needs a portable, rugged and reliable rifle/shotgun combination." It has a skeletonized metal buttstock that surrounds a polypropylene foam insert. The buttstock has cutouts for two shotgun shells, five .22 rimfire cartridges, and a cleaning kit. The design allows it to fold in half for more compact stowage. The shotgun barrels use interchangeable Remington-type choke tubes ("Rem-Choke") and each barrel has its own trigger. It uses a lever-action to cock the internal hammers and open the action. It has a tang safety located at the top rear (or "tang") of the receiver. It uses an M1 carbine-type rear sight and a fiber optic front sight. It also has Picatinny rails on the top and sides for mounting a variety of accessories.

== X Caliber ==
The Chiappa M6 is available with "X Caliber" adapter sleeves. The X Caliber consists of eight adapter sleeves that allow the 12-gauge models to fire .380 ACP, 9mm Luger, .38 Special/.357 Magnum, .40 S&W, .44 Special/.44 Magnum, .45 ACP, .45 Long Colt/.410 bore, and 20 gauge ammunition. There are also four adapter sleeves that allow the 20-gauge models to fire 9mm Luger, .38 Special/.357 Magnum, .45 ACP, and .45 Long Colt/.410 bore ammunition. These adapter sleeves are available separately and are compatible with any single- or double-barrel, 12- or 20-gauge break-action shotguns.

== See also ==
- Springfield Armory M6 Scout
- Chiappa Double Badger
- Chiappa Little Badger
- Chiappa Triple Crown
