= .22 Winchester Magnum Rimfire =

Rimfire cartridge

.22 Winchester Magnum
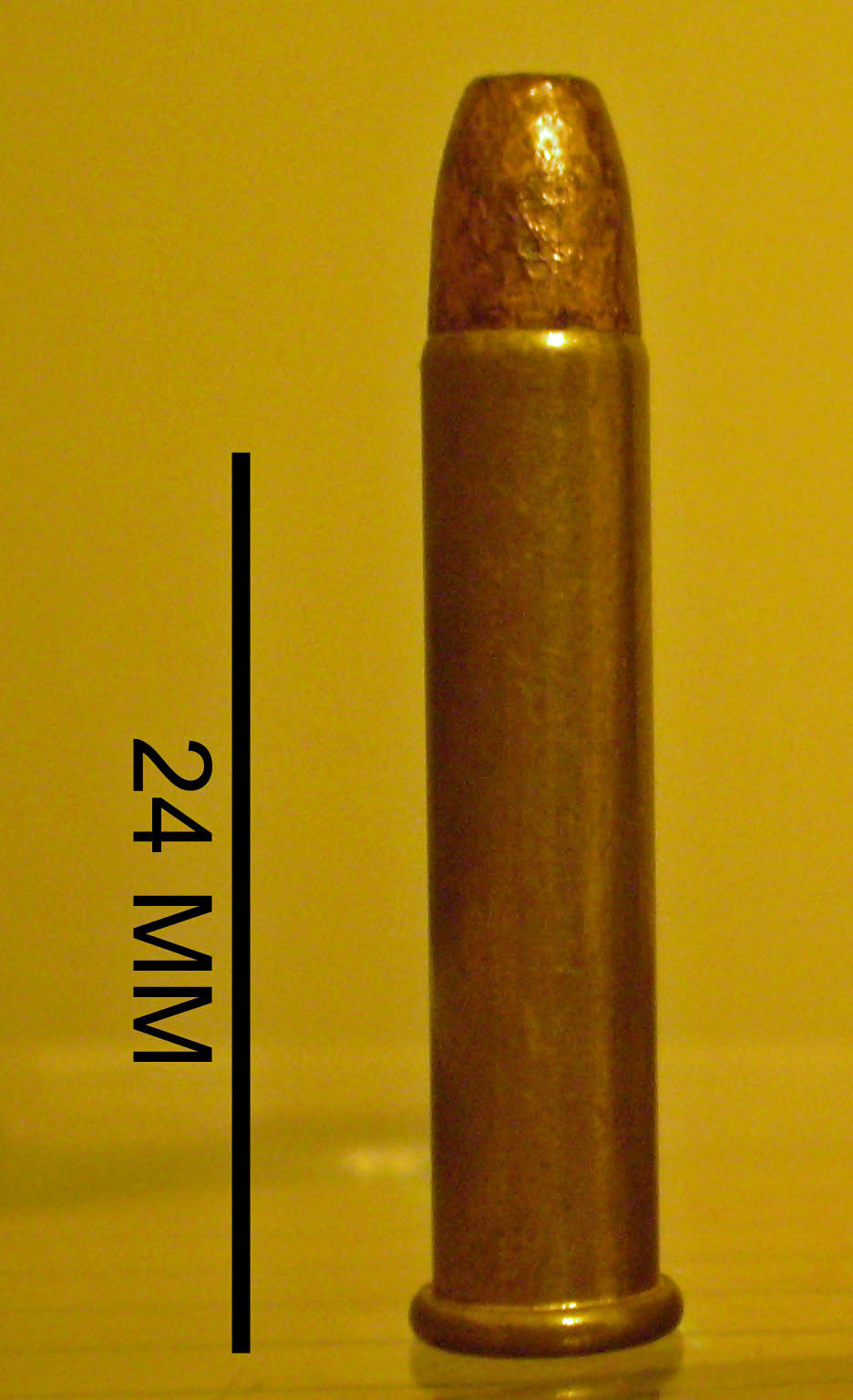
- .22 Winchester Magnum Rimfire
- Type: Rifle
- Place of origin: United States

Production history
- Designed: 1959
- Manufacturer: Winchester
- Produced: 1959–present

Specifications
- Parent case: .22 Winchester Rimfire
- Case type: Rimmed, straight
- Bullet diameter: .224 in (5.804 mm)
- Land diameter: .219 in (5.6 mm)
- Neck diameter: .2435 in (6.185 mm)
- Base diameter: .2455 in (6.236 mm)
- Rim diameter: .300 in (7.62 mm)
- Rim thickness: .050 in (1.27 mm)
- Case length: 1.055 in (26.8 mm)
- Overall length: 1.350 in (34.3 mm)
- Rifling twist: 1-16"
- Primer type: Rimfire
- Maximum pressure: 24,000 psi (170 MPa)

Ballistic performance
Bullet mass/type	Velocity	Energy
30 gr. (1.9 g) HP	2,300 ft/s (700 m/s)	352 ft⋅lbf (477 J)
40 gr. (2.6 g) JHP	1,875 ft/s (572 m/s)	312 ft⋅lbf (423 J)
50 gr. (3.2 g) JHP	1,530 ft/s (470 m/s)	260 ft⋅lbf (350 J)
- Test barrel length: 24 inches (610 mm); Source: Cartridges of the World

The .22 Winchester Magnum Rimfire, also known as the .22 WMR, .22 Magnum, .22 WMRF, .22 MRF, or .22 Mag, is a rimfire cartridge. Originally loaded with a 40 grains (2.6 g) bullet delivering velocities in the 2,000 feet per second (610 m/s) range from a rifle barrel, .22 WMR is now loaded with bullet weights ranging from 50 grains (3.2 g) at 1,530 feet per second (470 m/s) to 30 grains (1.9 g) at 2,200 feet per second (670 m/s).

== History ==
The .22 WMR was introduced in 1959 by Winchester, but was not used by Winchester until the Winchester Model 61 slide rifle could be chambered for it in 1960. The first rifle to be offered in the new chambering was the Marlin Levermatic rifle in 1959, because its design was easily modified to accept the more powerful cartridge. By the time of the introduction of the Winchester 61, Smith & Wesson and Ruger had revolvers for it, and Savage had come out with the Model 24 and since late 2012, the Model 42, a more modern update than the 24, a .22/.410 rifle/shotgun combination gun. It was the only successful rimfire cartridge introduced in the 20th century.

== Dimensions and loading ==
The .22 WMR uses a larger case than the more popular .22 LR, both in diameter and length. The .22 WMR case is a lengthened version of the older .22 WRF and both of these cartridges have the bullet seated within the case, instead of using a heeled bullet as in the .22 LR. In the most common modern .22 WMR loadings using a 40-grain (2.6 g) bullet, the combination of more powder and higher sustained pressures gives velocities of 1,875 feet per second (572 m/s) from a rifle and 1,500 feet per second (460 m/s) from a handgun. A .22 WMR round will not fit into the chamber of a .22 LR firearm due to the greater length and width of the case dimensions.

Although the bullet diameters are the same, the larger .22 WMR chamber does not support the smaller .22 LR cartridge. Firing the smaller .22 LR round in a .22 WMR chamber results in swollen or split cartridge cases, high-pressure gas leakage from the rear of the chamber, and bullets striking the chamber throat out of alignment, which can result in injury to the shooter or bystander and which does result in poor ammunition performance.

Gun makers offer .22 revolver models with cylinders chambered either in .22 LR or in .22 WMR and as convertible kits with both cylinders which allow the shooter to easily switch calibers on the same firearm.

== Uses ==
Since the .22 WMR uses bullets comparable in weight to the .22 Long Rifle, but is considerably faster, it shoots flatter and farther and hits harder at all ranges. The same 40-grain (2.6 g) bullet from a .22 WMR at 100 yards (91 m) still has 50% more kinetic energy than .22 LR at the muzzle. The .22 WMR provides improved penetration and more reliable expansion at longer ranges with expanding bullets.

If sighted in for maximum point blank range on a 3-inch (76 mm) high target, the 40-grain (2.6 g) .22 WMR has an effective range of nearly 125 yards (114 m). This makes the .22 WMR a short to medium-range varmint rifle and hunting rifle cartridge. The .22 WMR can kill small game such as rabbits, hares, groundhogs, prairie dogs, foxes, raccoons, opossums, and coyotes.

== Firearms using .22 WMR ==
It first appeared in the Marlin Model 57M Levermatic carbines in 1959, which was followed by the .22 WMR over .410 bore Savage Model 24 combination gun, followed by Winchester's own Model 61 and 275 pump-action rifles and Model 255 lever-action rifle. The Chiappa Double Badger combination gun also comes with a .22 WMR over .410 bore option. The Springfield Armory M6 Scout is also made in .22 Magnum over .410 bore. The Chiappa M6 Survival Gun is similar combination gun that comes with a 12 gauge or 20 gauge shotgun barrel over a .22 Magnum barrel.

A number of single-shot and repeating rifles were offered in .22 WMR. The .22 WMR operates at pressures beyond what normal blowback actions typically handle, but the self-loading Jefferson Model 159 was introduced for the cartridge. Until the 1990s, most .22 WMR firearms were bolt-action rifles. In 1977-1985 Harrington & Richardson produced the first American-made semi-automatic .22 WMR. In the 1990s semi-automatic .22 WMR rifles were also introduced by Ruger (10/22) and Marlin, and are currently produced by Remington (Model 597), Tanfoglio Appeal Rifle, Excel Arms Accelerator Rifle, Savage Arms, and Rossi.

Revolvers in .22 WMR are made by Smith & Wesson, Colt, Taurus, North American Arms, Heritage Arms, and Sturm Ruger. Semi-automatic pistols for this cartridge are (or were) produced by Kel-Tec, Smith & Wesson, Grendel and AMT, the latter two now defunct (AMT has been since resurrected by High Standard). The Grendel, AMT and Kel-Tec designs used specially designed chambers with flutes or gas ports, designed to lubricate the long, thin cartridge with gases from the chamber, allowing easy extraction of the cartridge. High-Standard produced various models and versions of their classic two-shot over/under derringer in both .22 WMR and .22 LR.

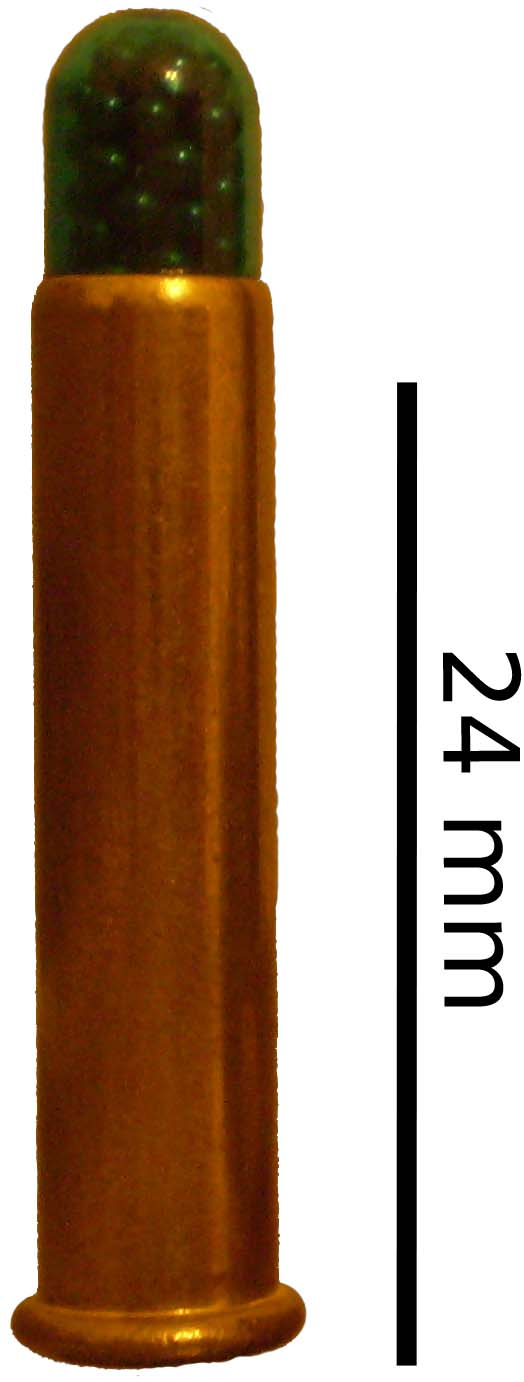
.22 WMR snake shot

The Marlin Model 25MG is a smooth bore, eight-shot, magazine-fed, .22 WMR, bolt-action shotgun manufactured by Marlin Firearms. It was specifically designed to use snake shot, and marketed as a "garden gun" for use in dispatching small garden and farm pests. It has an effective range of about 15 yards when using snake shot. Based on earlier Marlin .22 caliber designs, the garden gun was equipped with a high-visibility front sight but no rear sight. .22WMR have been used in experimental machine gun design, such as the prototype Stoehr machine pistol (1960-1970).

The Argentine EDDA submachine gun uses the .22 WMR round.

In 2014 Kel-Tec released the CMR-30, a PDW-style rifle chambered in .22 WMR with a 16" barrel and a 1:14 twist rate. It uses the same double stack 30-round magazine as the PMR-30.

In 2018 Standard Manufacturing introduced an 8-round .22 WMR revolver at the Las Vegas Shot Show. The revolver was originally introduced as the Volleyfire. The gun has side-by-side barrels, and fires 2 rounds of .22 WMR (1 bullet per barrel) with every pull of the trigger. In 2019 the gun went into production and was renamed "Thunderstruck".

In recent years, a few UK companies such as Guncraft Ltd have been making semi-automatic AR-15-style rifles chambered in 22 WMR, marketed to civilian shooters who, due to the UK's restrictive gun laws, do not have access to self-loading center-fire rifles.

== Ammunition ==
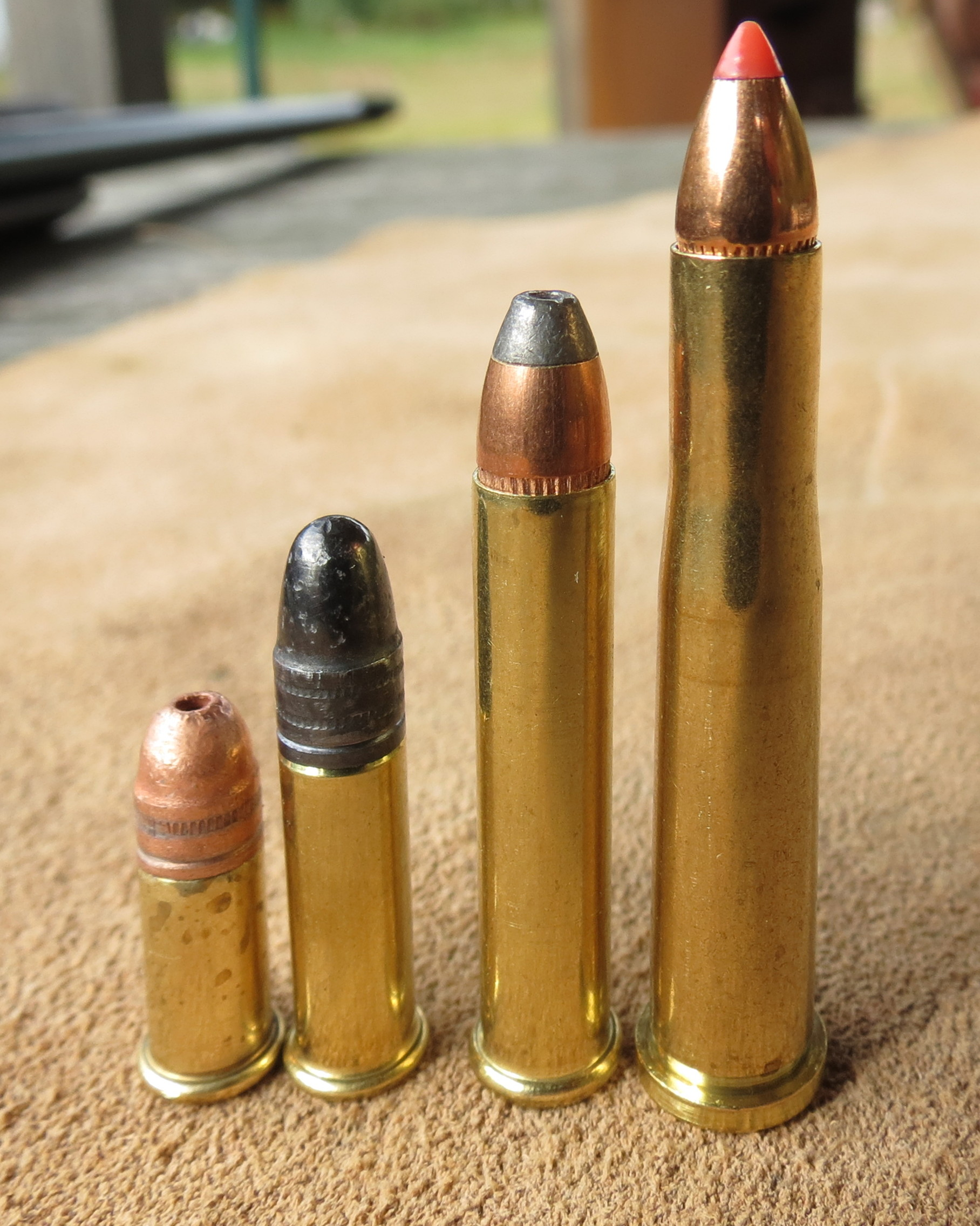
From the left, .22 Short, .22 LR, .22 Winchester Magnum Rimfire, and .22 Hornet

The .22 WMR is an enlarged, more powerful version of the much earlier .22 WRF. Despite frequent claims to the contrary, it cannot be safely used in any firearm except those specifically chambered for it. Even firearms chambered for the .22 WRF are not suitable; for one thing, the case lengths are different, and the fact that the cartridge fits into the chamber does not guarantee that using the wrong cartridge is either safe or effective.

The .22 WMR was for a time the most powerful rimfire round available; it even outperformed the .22 WCF. It has since been eclipsed in velocity and overall kinetic energy by the .17 Winchester Super Magnum.

Commonly available in retail stores, the selection and availability of the .22 WMR nevertheless does not match the popular .22 Long Rifle. Furthermore, .22 WMR is typically much more expensive than .22 LR per round, though it is comparable to .17 HMR, which is much more similar in overall performance, and is less expensive than .22 caliber centerfire ammunition.

Because many of the rifles that are chambered for the .22 WMR have tubular magazines, the bullet noses generally are flat or at least blunt to allow smooth feeding and reduce damage to the bullet. Although a pointed bullet in a rimfire cartridge will not contact the primer of the round in front of it (which is a hazard with centerfire cartridges in a tubular magazine), the manufacturer's stamp is in the middle of the base of a rimfire cartridge, and this may interfere with pointed metal bullets in a tube. However, Remington, CCI, and Hornady now produce bullet designs with 30 or 33-grain (2.1 g) polymer plastic ballistic tips that reduce the hazards of pointed ammunition in tubular magazines.

Bullets for the .22 WMR are generally unlubricated lead with heavy copper plating, in either solid nose or hollow point style designed for small game hunting or pest control (varmint hunting).

The limited selection of commercial ammunition for the .22 WMR has inspired specialist wildcatters to select the .22 WMR case for handloading high performance rimfire ammunition. Generally they load the wildcat cartridges with pointed bullets for the aerodynamic advantages, using the same bullets as those in .22 caliber centerfire cartridges. Though such bullets are generally heavier than standard .22 WMR, the sharp nose and tapered tail conserve energy better, delivering greater impact at longer ranges.

Other wildcatters neck the .22 WMR down to smaller calibers, such as .20 (5 mm) and .17 (4.5 mm) or even smaller, in an attempt to get maximum velocity and the flattest possible trajectory. An example of such an experimental design is the Swedish 4.5×26mm MKR.

== See also ==
- .22 BB
- .22 CB
- .22 Short
- .22 Long
- .22 Extra Long
- .22 Long Rifle
- .22 Hornet
- 5 mm caliber
- List of handgun cartridges
- List of rifle cartridges
- List of rimfire cartridges
- Table of handgun and rifle cartridges
