= TP-82 =

Combination gun carried by cosmonauts on Soviet space missions

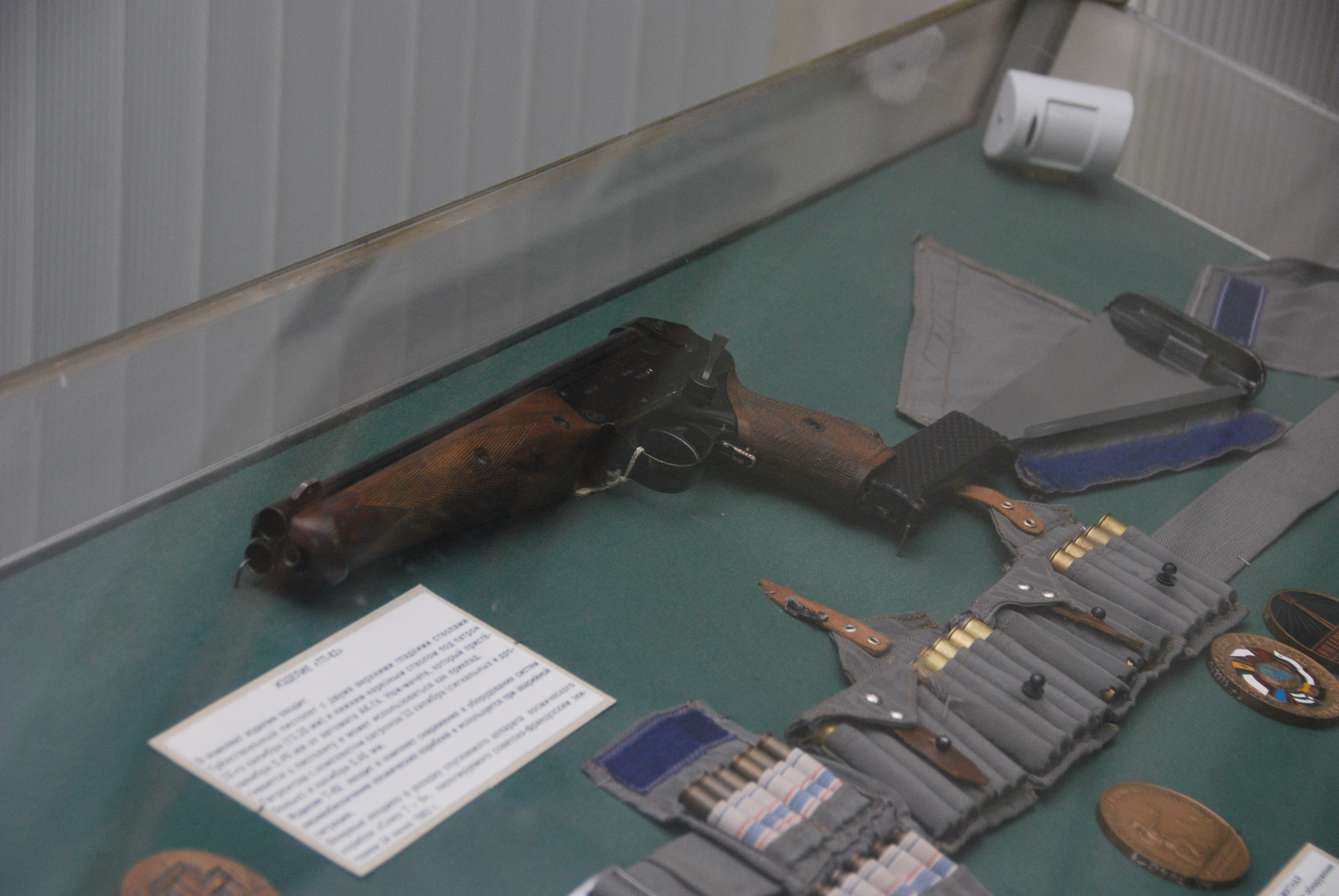
- TP-82 in the Military Historical Museum of Artillery, Engineers and Signal Corps in Saint Petersburg
- Type: Combination gun
- Place of origin: Soviet Union

Service history
- In service: 1986–2006
- Used by: Cosmonauts

Production history
- Designer: Igor Aleksandrovich Skrylev

Specifications
- Mass: 2.4 kg (5.3 lb) (with the buttstock attached)
- Cartridge: 12.5×70mm shotgun (over) and 5.45×39mm rifle (under)
- Barrels: 3 (2 shotgun and 1 rifle)
- Effective firing range: 200 m (220 yd)
- Feed system: Break-open
- Sights: Iron sights

The TP-82 (Russian: ТП-82) is an out-of-service triple-barreled Soviet combination gun carried by cosmonauts on space missions. It was intended as a survival aid to be used after landings and before recovery in the Siberian wilderness.

== Features ==
The TP-82 was designed to be compact and lightweight for storage within the limited space of a Soyuz descent module and to fulfill multiple roles, including those of a shotgun, flare gun, pistol and machete. Although it could be used for hunting, its primary purpose was defense against predators and the generation of visible and audible distress signals by firing flares from its shotgun barrels. The detachable buttstock is metal with a sharpened edge, allowing it to function as a machete; it is supplied with a canvas sheath to prevent injury when not in use.

The upper two side-by-side shotgun barrels fire 12.5×70 mm ammunition (40 gauge), while the lower single rifle barrel is chambered for 5.45×39mm ammunition developed for the AK-74 assault rifle. A large lever on the left side of the receiver opens the action, and a small grip safety beneath the trigger guard resembles a secondary trigger. According to NASA astronauts, the firearm is accurate to approximately 20–30 m (22–33 yd).

== History ==
The TP-82 was the result of cosmonaut Alexei Leonov's concerns after being stranded in the Siberian wilderness when his Voskhod capsule malfunctioned. He feared that the 9x18mm Makarov pistol that was provided in his survival kit would be ineffective against the Siberian wildlife, such as Eurasian brown bears and Eurasian wolves.

TP-82s were carried regularly on Soviet and Russian space missions from 1986 to 2006. They were part of the Soyuz Portable Emergency Survival Kit (Носимый аварийный запас, Nosimyi Avariynyi Zapas, NAZ).

In 2007, the media reported that the remaining ammunition for the TP-82 had become unusable and that a regular semi-automatic pistol would be used on future missions.

== See also ==
- M6 aircrew survival weapon
- M30 Luftwaffe Drilling
- Soviet laser pistol
