= Combination gun =

Type of firearm with at least one rifled barrel and one smoothbore barrel

A picture showing typical combination gun (top), drilling (middle), and vierling (bottom) barrel layouts

A combination gun is a firearm that usually comprises at least one rifled barrel and one smoothbore barrel, that is typically used with shot or some type of shotgun slug. Most have been break-action guns, although there have been other designs as well. Combination guns using one rifled and one smoothbore barrel are commonly found in an over-and-under configuration, while the side-by-side configuration is usually referred to as a cape gun. A combination gun with more than two barrels is called a drilling (German for "triplet") with three barrels, a vierling (German for "quadruplet") with four barrels, and a fünfling (German for "quintuplet") with five barrels. Combination guns generally use rimmed cartridges, as rimless cartridges are usually more difficult to extract from a break-action firearm.

== Use ==
Combination guns have a long history in Europe, the Middle East, Asia, and Africa that date back to the early days of metallic cartridge firearms. These guns are almost exclusively hunting arms. The advantage of having a single firearm that can fire both cartridges designed for rifled and smoothbore barrels is that a single gun can be used to hunt a very wide variety of game, from deer to game birds, and the shooter can choose the barrel appropriate for the target in seconds. As a result, they are popular with gamekeepers who often need the flexibility of the combination gun during their activities.

== Firing mechanisms ==
The earliest combination guns were called swivel guns, (not to be confused with the more widely known small cannon that is mounted on a swiveling stand or fork and allows a wide range of motion) which used a set of barrels designed to rotate to allow either the rifled or the smoothbore barrel to line up with a flintlock mechanism before firing. Modern combination guns tend to resemble double-barreled shotguns and double-barreled rifles, and are almost universally break open designs. Combination guns generally have a selector that allows the user to choose which barrel will fire. Three-barrel versions known as Drillings, are commonly found with two shotgun barrels and one rifle barrel, and generally have two triggers, one for each shotgun barrel, and a selector that will allow one trigger to fire the rifle barrel. Four-barrel versions known as Vierlings generally have two triggers, and selectors to switch between both the shotgun and rifle barrels.

== Layouts ==
=== Combination guns ===
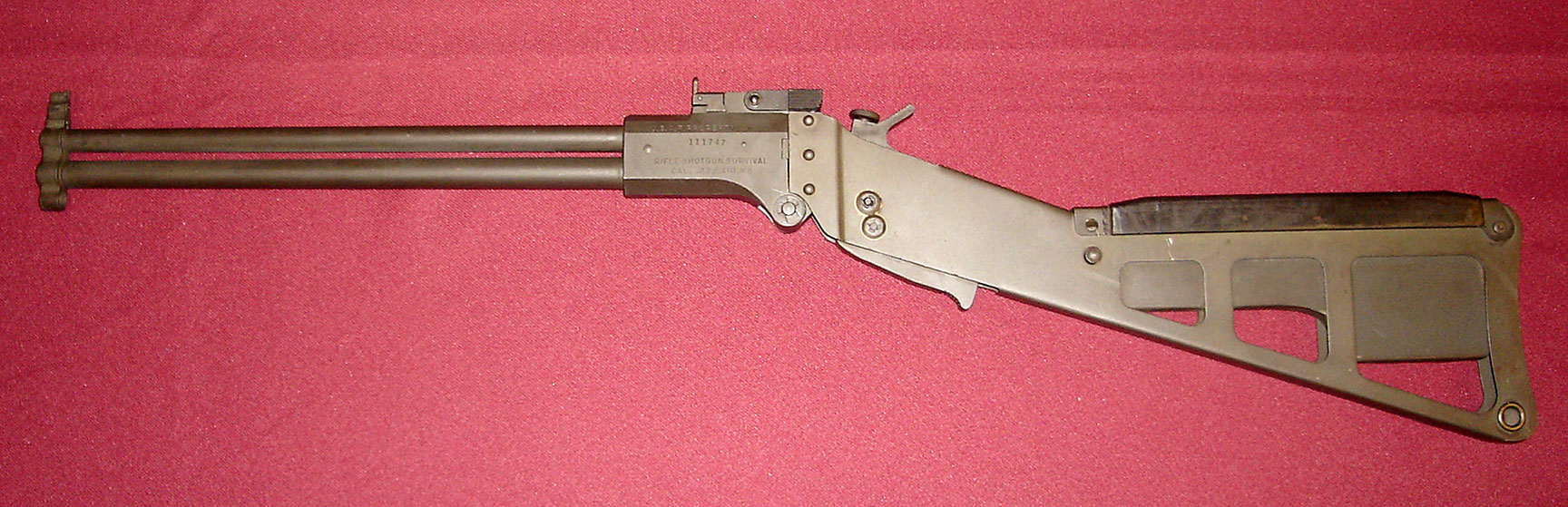
M6 Aircrew Survival Weapon

Combination guns are over/under designs such as the Savage Model 24, usually with a rifled barrel over a smoothbore barrel. Iron sights are commonly used for aiming the rifle, and the front sight alone is sufficient to point the shotgun. Scope mounts are available for some designs.

An interesting combination gun is the United States Air Force M6 Aircrew Survival Weapon and its civilian version, the Springfield Armory M6 Scout, an all-metal folding combination gun in .22 Hornet over .410 bore or .22 Long Rifle over .410 bore.

=== Cape guns ===
A cape gun is a side-by-side version of a combination gun and is typically European in origin. These were at one time popular in Southern Africa, where a wide variety of game could be encountered. British versions are commonly chambered for the .303 British service cartridge and a 12-gauge smoothbore barrel, with the rifled barrel positioned on the left. The German and Austrian cape guns have the rifled barrel on the right side, which is fired by the front trigger. The front trigger is usually a set trigger as well. The German and Austrian versions are commonly chambered for 9.3×72mmR or 9.3×74mmR rifle cartridges and 16-gauge or 12-gauge shotshells, as they were commonly carried by the old gamekeepers, although they were usually chambered in a much wider variety of available rifle and shotgun cartridges.

=== Drillings ===
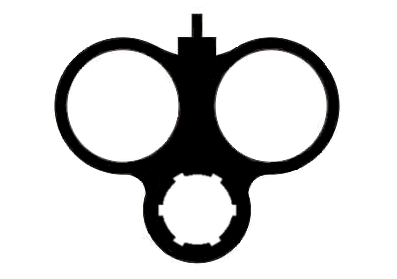
Common drilling barrel arrangement side-by-side shotgun barrels over a rifle barrel

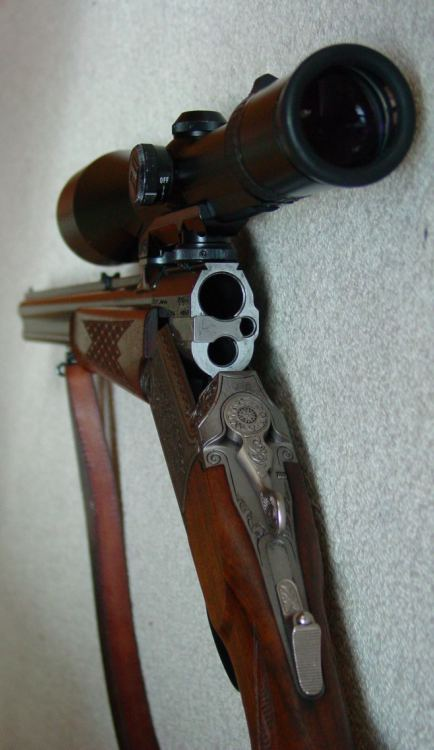
Scoped drilling with a shotgun, centerfire rifle and rimfire rifle barrels.

Drillings ("drilling" being German for "triplet") normally consist of two matching smoothbore barrels and a rifled barrel (German: Normaldrilling, common drilling), but may cover a much broader range of shapes and configurations.

Since drillings were generally made by small manufacturers, each maker would pick whichever layout they preferred, or whatever layout the customer ordered. The most common layout was a side-by-side shotgun with a centerfire rifled barrel centered on the bottom, such as the M30 Luftwaffe Drilling. A similar arrangement of a side-by-side shotgun with a rifled barrel centered on top, generally a .22 rimfire caliber or .22 Hornet, was also fairly common.

Rarer were the drillings that used two rifled barrels and a single smoothbore barrel. These were harder to make, since, like a double-barreled rifle, the rifled barrels must be very carefully regulated, that is, aligned during manufacture to shoot to the same point of aim at a given distance. This requires more precision than regulation of double-barreled shotgun barrels, which are used at shorter ranges with wide patterns of shot where a small misalignment won't be significant. If the rifled barrels were the same caliber, then the three barrels were generally arranged in a triangle, both rifled barrels on top or one rifled and the smoothbore barrel on top (this being known as a cross-eyed drilling). If the rifled barrels differed in caliber, generally the layout would be an over/under using the shotgun and a centerfire rifle barrel, with a rimfire rifle barrel mounted between and to one side. These configurations, with shotgun/centerfire/rimfire barrels, are the most desirable configuration for modern collectors.

The triple-barrel shotgun is the rarest configuration, and arguably is an odd variant of a double-barreled shotgun rather than a drilling since it lacks the rifle/shotgun combination that all the other drillings have. The triple-barrel shotgun is generally laid out like a side-by-side shotgun, with the third barrel centered and below the other two. Although, the Chiappa Triple Crown has a triangular arrangement with one on top and two below. This gives the Triple Crown a single-barrel sight picture. The barrels are all the same gauge.

An unusual but notable drilling is the TP-82, a short-barreled drilling pistol consisting of two 12.5x70mm (40-gauge) smoothbore shotgun barrels over a 5.45x39mm rifle barrel with a detachable shoulder stock that also doubled as a machete. It was developed by the Soviet Union as a survival gun for their cosmonauts, and was in use from 1986 to 2006, when it was retired because the unique ammunition it uses had degraded too far to be reliable.

=== Vierlings ===
Vierlings (German: Vierling, lit. 'quadruplet') generally consist of two matching smoothbore shotgun barrels, a .22 rimfire rifled barrel, and a centerfire rifled barrel, though they can come in a variety of configurations. Vierlings are quite rare and are almost always custom-made for the high-end commercial market. One example was the four-barreled Lancaster carbine, designed in the 19th century for the Maharajah of Rewa for hunting tigers.

=== Fünflings ===
Fünfling ("fünfling" being German for "quintuplet"), is an extremely rare type of combination gun because of its greater complexity of joining a compilation of five separate smoothbore and rifled barrels together within a single firearm design. Some of these layouts include a single smoothbore shotgun barrel on top of two rifle barrel calibers in a side-by-side and over-and-under configuration or two smoothbore shotgun barrels in a side-by-side configuration with three rifle barrel calibers between them that are stacked vertically in an over-and-under configuration.

== See also ==
- Chiappa Double Badger
- Chiappa M6 Survival Gun
- LeMat Revolver
- List of multiple-barrel firearms
- Marble Game Getter
- Multiple-barrel firearm
- S&T Daewoo K11
- M30 Luftwaffe Drilling
- Spotting rifle
- Caliber conversion device
