= Caliber conversion device =

Device used to allow a firearm to fire a different cartridge

A .32 ACP FMJ cartridge, a .32 ACP FMJ cartridge in a blued .303 British supplemental chamber, and a .303 British FMJ cartridge (left to right)

A caliber conversion device can be used to non-permanently alter a firearm to allow it to fire a different cartridge than the one it was originally designed to fire. The different cartridge must be smaller in some dimensions than the original design cartridge, and since smaller cartridges are usually cheaper, the device allows less expensive fire practice.

Alternative names sometimes imply the type of dimensional difference. A chamber insert may be used for a shorter cartridge of similar base diameter. A supplemental chamber or cartridge adapter is typically used for a shorter cartridge of reduced diameter. A cartridge conversion sleeve may include a short barrel of reduced bore diameter. Shotgun conversion sleeves may be called subgauge inserts, subgauge tubes, or gauge reducers.

Sleeves intended for rifle or handgun cartridges may have rifled barrels. Additional variations may allow centerfire weapons to fire rimfire ammunition and/or retain autoloading function with the smaller cartridge.

== Altering cartridge length ==
The simplest conversion is one that alters the length of the cartridge used, allowing a shorter but otherwise similarly dimensioned cartridge to be fired. Commonly called chamber inserts, these conversions resemble the front of the case, and are inserted into the firearm by placing over the new cartridge and inserting both into the chamber of the firearm. This seats the chamber insert into the front of the chamber, where it remains after firing. Once inserted, the chamber insert will remain in place until removed with the use of a stuck case remover. The most commonly encountered chamber inserts are ones designed to convert .30-06 Springfield to the shorter 7.62×51mm NATO. Since the chamber insert remains in the chamber, this type of conversion will function in semi-automatic firearms, and is commonly used in military surplus arms such as the M1 Garand, allowing the use of often less expensive surplus military ammunition.

== Altering the cartridge diameter ==
The next level in complexity involves altering the diameter of the cartridge used, typically allowing a short, straight walled handgun cartridge to be used in a rifle. These are often called supplemental chambers or cartridge adapters, and the entire supplemental chamber is treated like a cartridge, being loaded and ejected as a unit with the smaller cartridge. Since the barrel of the firearm is used, the caliber of the cartridges must match. The most commonly encountered supplemental chambers are for .30 caliber rifles designed for .308-inch (7.8 mm) diameter bullets, to use .32 caliber handgun cartridges with bullet diameters of approximately .312-inch (7.9 mm). Cartridge adapters have also been made to use .38 caliber handgun cartridges with bullet diameters of approximately .357-inch (9.1 mm) in .35 caliber rifles designed for bullets of .358-inch (9.1 mm) diameter.

Supplemental chambers in .22 caliber, and potentially .17 caliber as well, pose a special problem not shared by larger calibers. Rimfire cartridges, with their low cost, noise, and recoil, are ideal for use in a supplemental chamber, except for the fact that the firearm in question is almost certainly a centerfire design. This means that supplemental chambers that use a rimfire cartridge must also provide a special offset firing pin. This is a metal insert that fits behind the rimfire cartridge, and has an appropriate projection to act as a firing pin. When this insert is hit by the firearm's firing pin, it is pushed forwards, which causes it to crush the rim of the rimfire cartridge, igniting it. Use of the centerfire to rimfire conversion requires a longer case, and so is not suitable for short cartridges such as .22 Hornet. A notable exception to this is the Thompson Center Arms Contender, which has both centerfire and rimfire firing pins which can be selected with the turn of a switch, and does not require a centerfire to rimfire converter. The Hammond Game Getter works around this problem in its sleeves for .22 rimfire by creating an eccentric chamber that places the rim of the .22 cartridge in the center of the original chamber, thus allowing the firing pin to strike it directly.

Since the supplemental chambers are approximately the size of a normal loaded cartridge, they will usually feed from a magazine, though they will not provide sufficient energy to cycle an automatic action.

== Altering the caliber ==
The most complete transformation is offered by the caliber conversion sleeve. These include not only a new chamber, but a new barrel as well, allowing a smaller diameter bullet to be fired. These sleeves may be significantly longer than a loaded cartridge, if the length of the parent cartridge is not sufficient to provide the desired performance. Unlike the other types of cartridge conversions, this type incorporates rifling to stabilize the bullet; the other types rely on the rifling in the firearm's barrel.

=== Chamber length sleeves ===
Chamber length sleeves are restricted in its overall length, where a short cartridge is used with a long parent cartridge. The sleeve is rifled up to the end of the sleeve. Since most cartridge cases are only about 5 cm (2.0 in) long, this provides a limited power advantage. On the other hand, these will function from magazines in the same way as supplemental chambers, and allow the use of inexpensive rimfire ammunition in firearms chambered in .22 caliber (5.56 mm) or smaller.

=== Greater than chamber length sleeves ===
Sleeves that exceed the chamber length are generally used in break open actions, which allow easy insertion and removal. Like supplemental chambers, caliber conversion sleeves completely surround the new cartridge case, but cannot be ejected or fed from a magazine, so they only offer a single shot per barrel without manual extraction and reloading.

The calibers supported by caliber conversion sleeves are limited by the difference between the calibers. The sleeve's barrel must be thick enough to provide structural integrity to the barrel, and so requires a large enough internal barrel diameter to hold the new barrel. One manufacturer has a .40 caliber (10 mm) minimum diameter for these inserts in .22 rimfire caliber.

Some manufacturers offer caliber conversion sleeves for shotguns, which convert a shotgun into a rifle with the use of a rifled barrel.

== Shotguns ==
Inserts for shotguns are called subgauge inserts, and function in much the same manner as inserts for handguns or rifles. However, due to the nature of shotguns, the implications of using an insert differ.

Since shotgun shells are all straight walled, a change in chambering means a change in diameter of the shell. However, since subgauge inserts are designed to be used with shot, not slugs, the shotgun's barrel can continue to be used, with little or no impact on patterning. Many makers offer longer inserts, though due to the variations in shotgun bore diameters, these usually require custom manufacture.

Rifled inserts are also available, to allow the use of handgun cartridges or relatively low-power rifle cartridges such as the 12 gauge X Caliber adapter sleeves.

== Automatic firearm conversions ==
Conversions for automatic firearms are often more complex than those for single shot or manual repeaters, as the difference in power available to the operating mechanism can be significant. There are a number of makers of cartridge conversions that convert various centerfire firearms to .22 Long Rifle, operating both as cartridge conversions and caliber conversions.

These conversions typically convert the firearm from gas operation or recoil operation to a simple blowback operation. This typically involves replacing the firearm's bolt or slide with a lightweight part lacking the locking mechanism, and a reduced power spring. The magazine must also be replaced, and in the case of caliber conversions, often the barrel as well. Conversions for short recoil pistols, such as the M1911, Glock, and Beretta 92 consist of a new upper assembly and magazine. Conversions for .22 caliber centerfire rifles and carbines such as the AR-15 and Mini-14 consist of a magazine and an insert that replaces the bolt and includes a cartridge conversion insert that goes into the chamber. Conversions for rifles and carbines of larger caliber, such as the AK-47 or Thompson submachine gun include a rifled insert barrel extending beyond the length of the chamber.

One exception to the use of a special lightweight bolt was the Colt Service Ace, offered as a complete pistol or as a conversion kit for the M1911. While still nominally a blowback conversion, the Service Ace used a special "floating" chamber in the barrel that acted like a gas operated firearm's piston, helping push the bolt back with more force than a typical .22 Long Rifle blowback action. This additional force allowed the small .22 Long Rifle cartridge to cycle a standard weight slide, which made the pistol handle more like the standard .45 ACP version.

Another cartridge conversion was the Pedersen device, which was designed to convert the bolt action Springfield 1903 Mark I into a 40 shot blowback semi-automatic firearm chambering a lengthened version of the .32 ACP cartridge. The 1903 Mark I differed from the standard rifle in that it had a slot cut in one side of the receiver, which served as an ejection port for the Pedersen device. The Pedersen device replaced the bolt of the 1903, and loaded from a magazine inserted from the top right of the receiver. Intended as a "secret weapon", the device was not ready for issue before the end of World War I, and it was eventually declared obsolete without being issued, and all but a handful of the devices were destroyed by the military.

== Uses ==
In addition to often being less expensive than the larger cartridge, the smaller cartridges offer much reduced recoil and muzzle blast. Potential utility for short range target practice or killing small pests is limited by significantly reduced accuracy of handgun bullets encountering faster rifling twist after gaining velocity in the long jump through the unrifled adapter. Low-powered ammunition, such as the .22 LR, allows the use of indoor ranges or outdoor ranges with smaller downrange impact areas. This can make it possible to conduct training in places where live firing would not be possible (for safety or regulatory reasons) if firing the original full-power ammunition.

With shotguns, the smaller shot load carried by a smaller shell increases the challenge of hitting targets, and therefore can be used as a handicap for a skilled shooter, or to increase difficulty when training.

Some European conversions exist for special gallery cartridges, similar in concept to the .22 CB rounds, which use a primer but no gunpowder. These adapters were chambered for centerfire versions of these tiny rounds, such as the 4mm 4mm Übungsmunition cartridge. Gallery cartridges such as these were intended for use in indoor target practice, and are similar in power and report to an airgun.

== In media ==
- An episode of the television series Columbo featured a "calibration converter," as it was called in the show. The killer had a large handgun collection in his office but none of them matched the .22 caliber of the bullet he used to kill the victim. Still, Columbo suspected the killer. To find out how he could have committed the murder, Columbo cleverly utilized subliminal cuts to get the killer to expose himself.

== See also ==
- Cadet trainer
- Collet locking
- Glossary of firearms terms
- List of established military terms
- Military education and training
- Weapon effects simulation
- Range-finder painting
