= 20-gauge shotgun =

Smoothbore/rifled shotgun caliber

20-gauge/20-bore
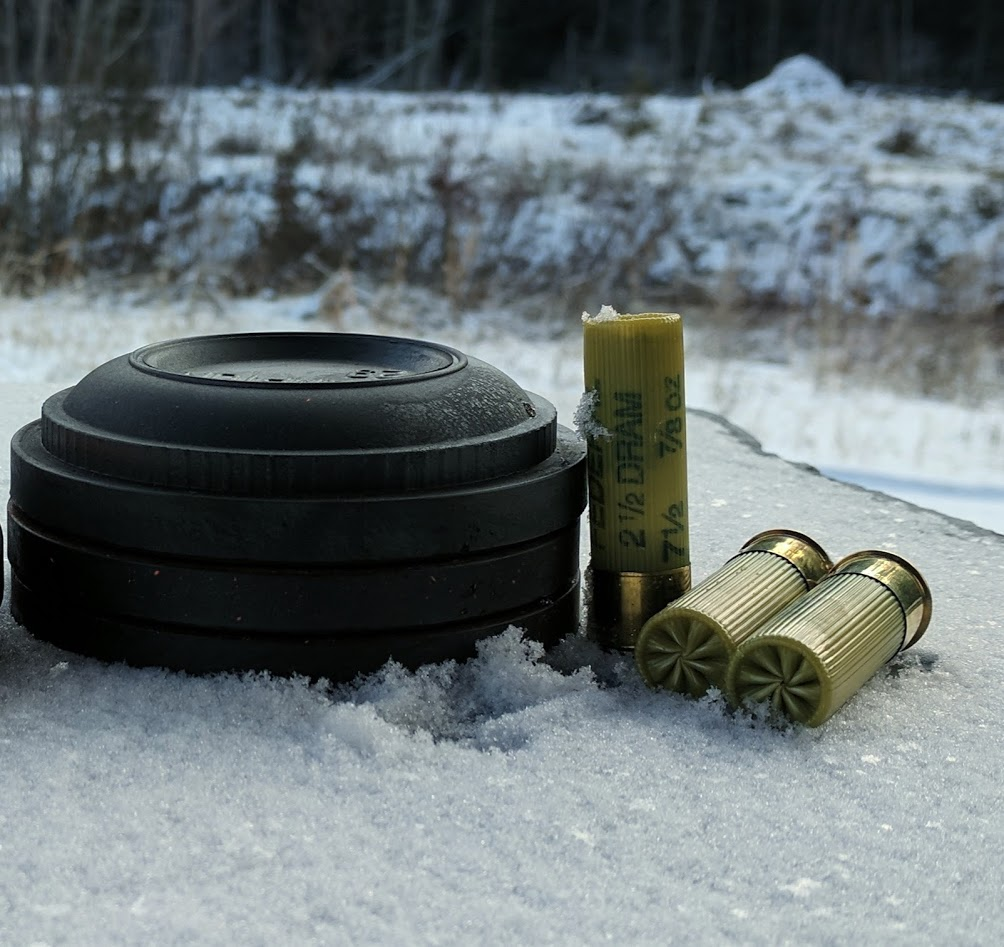
- Three 2 3/4" 20-gauge shells (right) loaded with #7 1/2 birdshot
- Type: Shotgun
- Place of origin: United Kingdom

Production history
- Manufacturer: Various
- Variants: 2 1/2" (63.5 mm); 2 3/4" (70 mm); 3" (76.2 mm)

Specifications
- Case type: Rimmed, straight
- Bullet diameter: .615 in (15.6 mm)
- Shoulder diameter: .684 in (17.4 mm)
- Base diameter: .697 in (17.7 mm)
- Rim diameter: .766 in (19.5 mm)
- Rim thickness: .0484 in (1.23 mm)
- Case length: 2.76 in (70 mm)
- Primer type: Shotshell primer
- Maximum pressure: 12,000 psi (83 MPa)

Ballistic performance
| Bullet mass/type | Velocity | Energy |
|---|---|---|
| 273.438 gr (18 g) 5/8 oz. Remington Slugger 2 3/4" Slug | 1,800 ft/s (550 m/s) | 1,967 ft⋅lbf (2,667 J) |
| 273.438 gr (18 g) 5/8 oz. Remington Slugger 2 3/4" Slug | 1,580 ft/s (480 m/s) | 1,513 ft⋅lbf (2,051 J) |
| 468 gr (30 g) Federal 2 3/4" 1 1/8 oz. #3 Buckshot | 1,200 ft/s (370 m/s) | 1,496 ft⋅lbf (2,028 J) |
| 546.875 gr (35 g) 1 1/4 oz. Fiocchi 3" #5 Shot | 1,200 ft/s (370 m/s) | 1,748 ft⋅lbf (2,370 J) |
| 382.812 gr (25 g) 7/8 oz. Winchester 2 3/4" #7 1/2 Shot | 1,200 ft/s (370 m/s) | 1,224 ft⋅lbf (1,660 J) |

A 20-gauge shotgun, also known as 20 bore or 20 gauge, is a type of smoothbore shotgun. Twenty-gauge shotguns have a bore diameter of .615 in (15.6 mm), while a 12-gauge shotgun has a bore diameter of .729 in (18.5 mm). Twelve-gauge and 20-gauge shotguns are the most popular gauges in the United States, where ownership of firearms is common. The 20-gauge is popular among upland game hunters, target shooters, and skeet shooters in many areas of the world.

== Description ==
Twenty lead balls of a 20-gauge shotgun bore weigh one pound, while just 12 lead balls of a 12-gauge shotgun bore weigh the same. A 20-gauge shotgun is more suitable for hunting certain types of game or for some hunters because it may have less felt recoil than an identical shotgun in a larger gauge, and guns may be smaller and weigh less, though this has changed since the introduction of the 3-inch magnum shotshell.

Regarding the yellow body tube color that 20-gauge ammunition usually has, it has been reserved in SAAMI documentation saying "SAAMI has reserved yellow for 20 gauge ammunition" "This ammunition shall have a body tube that is primarily yellow" "Yellow shall not be used for any other gauge/bore shotshell body" "No other recommendations are made as to the color of service body tubes for other gauges/bores" This color designation may be designed to aid in identifying 20-gauge shells. A 20 ga shell, if mixed in with 12-gauge shells, will enter the chamber and lodge inside the bore at the end of the chamber. The result is catastrophic if a 12 ga shell is loaded and fired behind the lodged 20 ga shell.

== Specifications ==
20-gauge shotguns are especially suitable for hunting game birds such as quail, grouse, and mallards when using lead-free birdshot. While slug loads are ballistically less accurate than rounds used in rifles, powerful, high-grain slug loads can provide improved ballistics for hunting deer when paired with a rifled barrel.

== Recoil ==
On average, 20-gauge rounds will produce less muzzle energy than 12-gauge rounds, resulting in reduced perceived recoil. However, there are many variables that affect perceived recoil, including gun weight, action type, stock pattern, shot weight, shell size, etc. There may be little to no difference between the two when using target ammunition. Loads for waterfowl will tend to produce more felt recoil in a 12-gauge shotgun than in a 20, but this may not be the case depending on the gun used. Full-power 20-gauge shells fired from a light 5 lb (2.3 kg) gun will have more felt recoil than those fired from a heavy 7 lb (3.2 kg) gun. For a fair comparison, two identical shotguns, one in 12 and one in 20, with identical ammunition (other than gauge) have to be compared. In those cases, the 12-gauge does generate more recoil energy than the 20.

== See also ==
- Gauge (firearms)
- Cartridge (firearms)
- Shotgun shell
