= Break action =

Type of firearm action

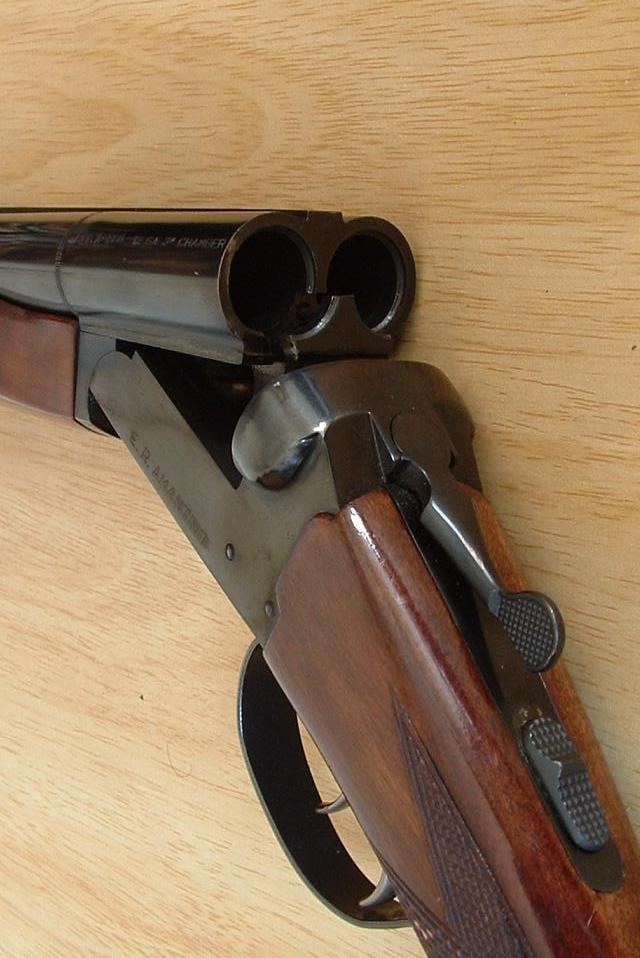
A view of the break-action of a typical double-barrelled shotgun, with the action open and the extractor visible. The opening lever and the safety catch can also be clearly seen.

Break action is a type of firearm action in which the barrel(s) are hinged much like a door and rotate perpendicularly to the bore axis to expose the breech and allow loading and unloading of cartridges. A separate operation may be required for the cocking of a hammer to fire the new round. There are many types of break-action firearms; break actions are universal in double-barreled shotguns, double-barreled rifles, combination guns, and are commonly found in single shot pistols (especially derringers), rifles, shotguns, including flare guns, grenade launchers, air guns, and some older revolver designs. They are also known as hinge-action, break-open, break-barrel, break-top, or, on old revolvers, top-break actions.

== Description ==
=== Break action ===
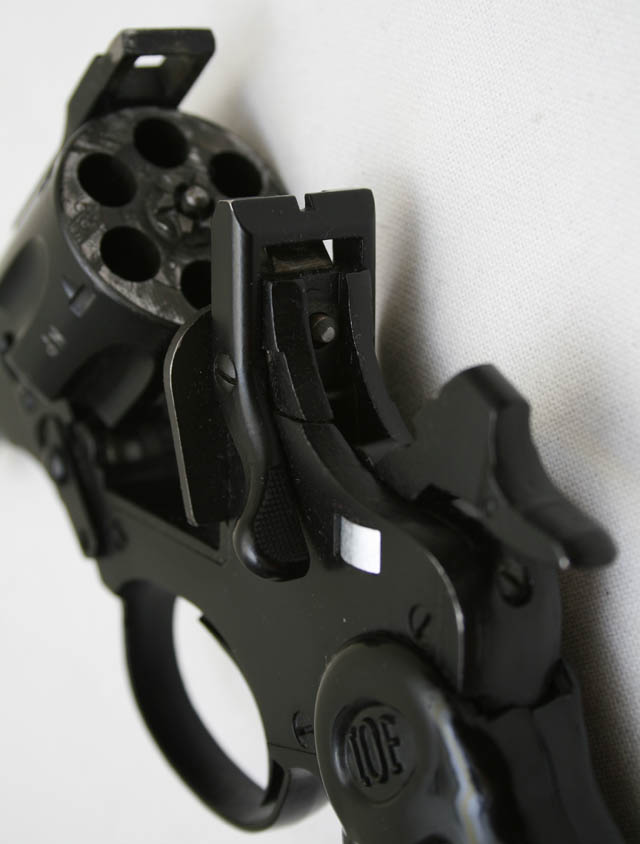
Close-up of an IOF 32 break-action revolver

The first break-action revolver was patented in France and Britain at the end of December in 1858 by Devisme. A substantial hinge pin joins the two parts of the rifle or shotgun; the stock with its firing mechanism and the fore-piece and barrel, which hold the round to be fired. In some cases the hinging pin may be easily removable, allowing the two portions of the weapon to be compactly and safely stored. In other cases the hinge will consist of a hook over a pin; releasing an auxiliary latch will allow sufficient travel to allow the hinge to be unhooked.

A latch is operated to release the two parts of the weapon, allowing the breech to be exposed. Rounds are inserted into the breech, loading as many barrels (pistol, rifle, or shotgun) or chambers (revolver) as desired, and the mechanism is closed and latched. The hammer is then pulled back and latched. The weapon can now be fired by squeezing the trigger.

After firing the rounds, the break action is unlatched and the barrel and forearm are allowed to fall forward. This causes an extractor catch to remove the spent shells so that they fall to the ground, leaving the weapon ready for reloading.

=== Tip-up action ===
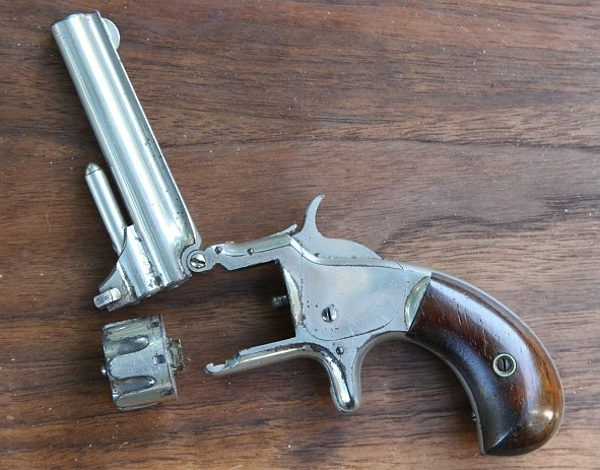
Smith & Wesson Model 1 Third Issue open

The tip-up was the first revolver designed for use with metallic cartridges in the Smith & Wesson Model 1, on which the barrel pivoted upwards, hinged on the forward end of the top strap. On S&W tip-up revolvers, the barrel release catch is located on both sides of the frame in front of the trigger.

== Advantages ==
A break action is one of the most compact firearm actions. Since there are no parts to reciprocate, it is shorter than repeating designs, and generally more compact than other non-repeating firearms such as falling block and rolling block actions. This compactness results in reductions in weight and size compared to larger actions; this can also allow a longer barrel in a firearm of similar size.

Since the cartridge extractor or ejector is built into the barrel assembly in break action weapons, the breech face is simply a flat plate with a hole for the firing pin to protrude through. This makes break actions ideal for interchangeable barrel firearms, such as the popular Thompson/Center Arms Contender and Encore pistols. The simplicity of the break-open design, especially with an external hammer, also reduces the cost of manufacture. There were a number of companies, such as H&R Firearms, that produced break-action rifles at lower costs than comparable bolt-action rifles.

While most firearms are designed for right-handed shooters, break-action guns operate identically when fired from either shoulder.

Another advantage of the break action is the ability to insert shorter cartridges into the chamber, like the 12-gauge 1.75-inch Mini-shells from Aguila Ammunition and Federal Premium Ammunition Shorty Shotshells, which can have problems cycling in other action types. This also allows chambering for cartridges of a length impractical in other designs, as well as easy use of caliber conversion sleeves. It is common to find conversion sleeves for double-barrel shotguns, allowing the firing of smaller-gauge shells as well as sub-bore pistol and rifle cartridges (and thus allowing the same gun to be used with, for example, 12 gauge through 28 gauge, as well as .410 bore shells).

Finally, break action firearms are often favored for competition such as trap shooting and skeet shooting in which groups of shooters must unavoidably congregate with their firearms. The nature of a break action inherently indicates when a round is chambered, and thus an open or closed action contributes to all participants' awareness as to whether a weapon that can be fired is present. This is considered a safety advantage.

== Disadvantages ==
The break action design is best suited for non-repeating firearms. To get multiple shots requires either multiple barrels or a revolving cylinder; while this is fairly simple for shotguns, with double-barreled shotguns being quite common and even a few quadruple-barreled shotguns such as the FAMARS Rombo, double rifles require very precise alignment of the barrels in order to achieve consistent accuracy known as regulation. Modern double rifles are very expensive and designed for short-range use; the barrels are often regulated for ranges under 110 yards (100 m) for use against dangerous game.

Wear in the mechanism is focused upon the small contact area of the latch, and the breech is difficult to seal properly once the latch wears. In some firearms such as Thompson/Center guns, the latch is a removable part that can be replaced when worn. Designs without a replaceable latch may be fixed by building up the worn part with a welder, then filing it back into shape.

Break-open actions are also not as inherently strong as other action types, such as the falling-block, rendering them capable of withstanding only relatively low-pressure pistol and rifle cartridges. The action is usually held closed by a single locking lug, usually below the barrel in a single-barrelled gun or between the barrels of a double-barreled gun. The single lug must carry all of the force of firing the cartridge. For shotguns, which operate at very low pressures, this is not an issue.

Some centerfire pistol and rifle cartridges, however, can generate pressures that may be too great for a single locking lug if it is not stout enough. The Thompson/Center Contender, for example, was limited to .30-30 Winchester level cartridges. To fire more powerful cartridges requires a much larger locking lug, such as that which Thomson Center used on the larger Encore model. By comparison, while bolt-action shotguns may only use a single locking lug, almost all bolt-action rifles use multiple locking lugs around the perimeter of the bolt to provide an even distribution of the forces of firing, providing a much higher intrinsic strength. Since many break-action pistols and rifles, such as the inexpensive H&R models, are built on large frames originally meant for shotguns, the action is very heavily built and capable of handling moderate to high pressures. Still, belted magnum cartridges such as .300 Winchester Magnum are generally only found in the highest-quality break-action rifles.

Break-open designs work best with rimmed cartridges, which can use a solid extractor. Rimless cartridges require a spring-loaded extractor, which can slide out of the way for cartridge insertion and spring back to engage the recessed rim. While these spring-loaded extractors are found on even inexpensive models, they are not as strong as solid extractors, which increases the likelihood that failures to extract will occur more often.

== Other long gun actions ==
- Bolt action
- Falling-block action
- Lever action
- Pump action
- Rolling block
- Semi-automatic firearm
- Straight-pull action

== See also ==
- Combination gun
