= 8 bore =

19th-century firearms caliber

- Type: Combination guns (containing both smoothbore and rifled barrels), also single-shot (doubled barreled) rifles and shotguns
- Place of origin: United Kingdom

Specifications
- Bullet diameter: .835 in (21.2 mm)

The 8 bore (Commonwealth English), also known as the 8 gauge (American English), is an obsolete caliber used commonly in the 19th-century black-powder firearms for hunting large dangerous game.

== Design ==
An 8 bore is a .835 in (21.2 mm) caliber firearm. Historically it was used to fire solid projectiles from smoothbores, rifles, and partially rifled ball and shot guns, as well as shot from muzzle-loading and breech-loading shotguns. Later breech loaders were designed to fire cartridges.

== History ==
8 bore 3¼-inch shotgun cartridge
- Type: Shotgun

Specifications
- Bullet diameter: .835 in (21.2 mm)
- Base diameter: .913 in (23.2 mm)
- Rim diameter: .998 in (25.3 mm)
- Case length: 3.25 in (83 mm)

=== Shot loadings ===
The 8 bore was a popular wildfowling calibre both in muzzleloaders and later cartridge shotguns. 8 bore cartridges were available in multiple lengths including 3-inch, 3¼-inch, 3¾-inch and 4-inch.

8 bore black powder cartridge loadings
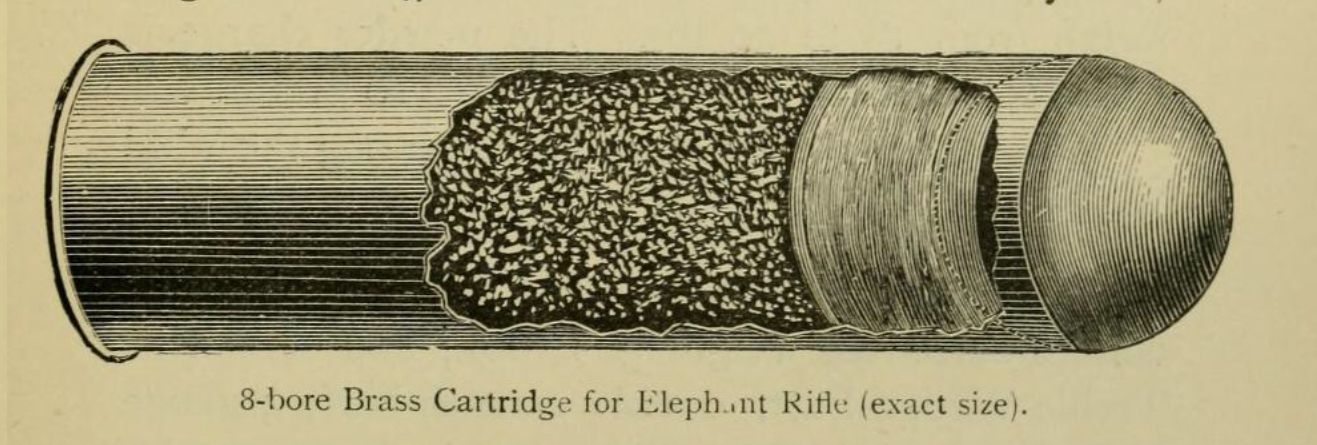
- Illustration of an 8 bore rifle cartridge
- Type: Rifle

Specifications
- Bullet diameter: .835 in (21.2 mm)
- Shoulder diameter: .915 in (23.2 mm)
- Base diameter: .928 in (23.6 mm)
- Rim diameter: 1.135 in (28.8 mm)
- Case length: 3.490 in (88.6 mm)
- Overall length: 3.980 in (101.1 mm)
- Filling: Black powder
- Filling weight: 10 drams (17.7 g)

Ballistic performance
| Bullet mass/type | Velocity | Energy |
|---|---|---|
| 862 gr (56 g) Spherical | 1,654 ft/s (504 m/s) | 5,232 ft⋅lbf (7,094 J) |
| 1,257 gr (81 g) Conical | 1,500 ft/s (460 m/s) | 7,020 ft⋅lbf (9,520 J) |
- Test barrel length: 26; Sources: Experts on guns and shooting.

=== Solid loadings ===
When the Dutch established the Dutch Cape Colony in the 17th century, they soon discovered their muskets were hopelessly inadequate against local game. Within a century the most popular Boer firearm was a flintlock smoothbore musket of about 8 bore with a 5 to 6 ft (1.5 to 1.8 m) barrel. Early British settlers of the Cape Colony in the 18th century also found specialist firearms were required for the local game. European gunmakers responded with various long arms from the enormous (although seldom produced) 2 bore down.

By the 19th century, the giant 4 bore had been established as the standard elephant gun amongst European settlers and explorers within Africa, whilst the 8 bore was considered the standard for all other dangerous game. Typical 8 bores weighed 15 to 16 lb (6.8 to 7.3 kg), and fired a 1,250 gr (81 g) conical bullet at around 1,500 ft/s (460 m/s) or an 860 gr (56 g) spherical ball at around 1,650 ft/s (500 m/s), both with 10 to 12 drams (17.72 to 21.26 g) of black powder, although sometimes heavier charges of 14 drams (24.82 g) were used, generally in Africa.

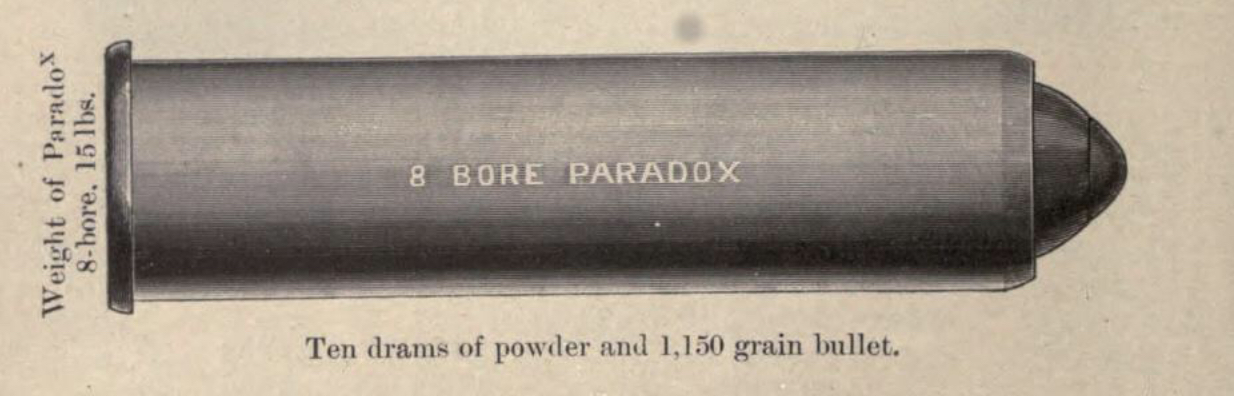
8 bore paradox cartridge

In the late 19th century, William W Greener conducted the most thorough research of any gunmaker into the requirements for African hunting. After extensive testing and lengthy discussions with returned hunters and adventurers, including Sir Samuel Baker, he concluded the 8 bore was the largest practical calibre required for hunting dangerous game. Additionally, due to the increased felt recoil of rifled weapons, he recommended the 8 bore as the largest calibre for a rifle, and that firearms above 8 bore be smoothbores.

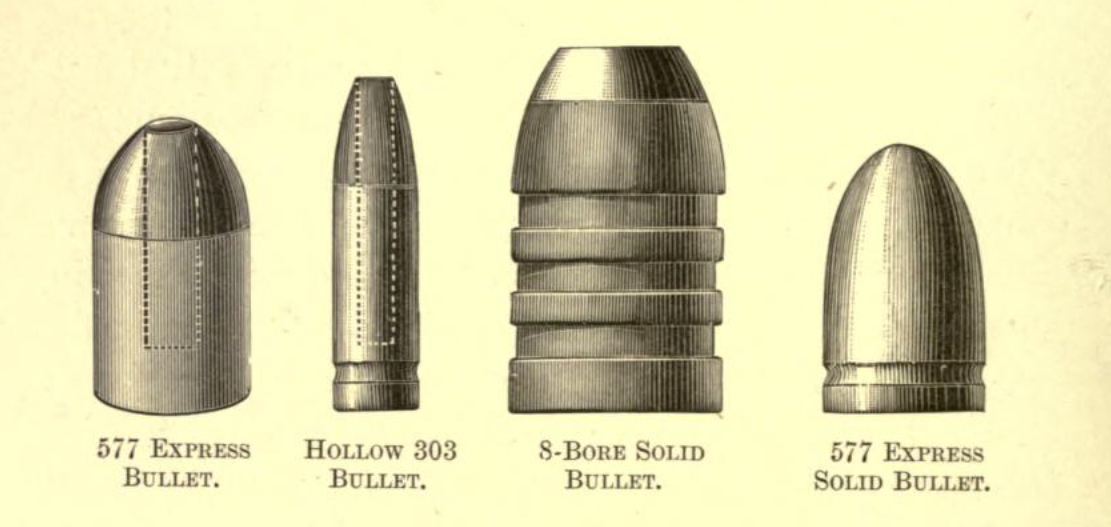
Comparison of .577 Black Powder Express, .303 British & 8 bore bullets

The most common 8 bore cartridges used paper cases, much like shotgun shells, and true .835 in (21.2 mm) caliber projectiles. A larger version utilising a thin brass case was also available, although it fired .875 in (22.2 mm) projectiles, in reality making it a 7 bore.

== Modern uses ==
In modern times, the 8 bore has uses in the mining, cement, and steel industry. It has been used to knock down overhangs in mines or quarries, break up bridging or stoppages in silos, to desist boiler tubes, and remove slag deposits from rotary kilns, by blasting away at them from a safe distance. This can be done while the kiln is in operation in some instances. Various slug loadings are in production for different industrial uses. Using the C.I.P. method, the chamber pressure for the 8 bore industrial shotgun shell is 32,000 psi (220 MPa)

== In popular culture ==
In the 2008 American Western film Appaloosa starring, co-written and directed by actor Ed Harris, supporting actor Viggo Mortensen's character Everett Hitch carries an 8 gauge shotgun. This is also true for the same-named character in Robert B. Parker's series of Western novels on which the aforementioned movie is based.

== See also ==
- List of rimmed cartridges
- Gauge (bore diameter)
- 6 bore
- 10 bore
