= 6 bore =

Black powder hunting caliber

- Type: Rifle, Shotgun
- Place of origin: United Kingdom

Specifications
- Bullet diameter: .919 in (23.3 mm)

The 6 bore, also known as the 6 gauge, is an obsolete caliber that was used commonly in 19th-century black-powder firearms.

== Design ==
The 6 bore is a .919 in (23.3 mm) caliber firearm, used both as a shotgun firing shot and solid projectiles from muzzleloaders and breech loaders, both in smoothbore and rifled long guns. Late breech loaders were designed to fire cartridges.

A 6 bore cartridge rifle built by W.W. Greener in 1891 for a southern African trekker called Viljoen, fired 1,750 gr (113 g) bullets at 1,550 to 1,600 ft/s (470 to 490 m/s). Three types of ammunition were supplied, hardened lead for elephants and rhinoceros, slightly hardened lead for buffalo, and pure lead with a copper tube hollow point for lion.

== History ==
Early 6 bores tended to be large muzzle loading shotguns that were used for wildfowling. While designed to fire shot, experiences with dangerous game in Africa and India led to them also being loaded with solid projectiles. These projectiles were usually propelled by a double charge of black powder.

By the 1850s, the ivory trade was well developed in Africa and India, and muzzle loaded 6 bores were relatively popular, particularly for rifled weapons as opposed to smoothbores. As breech loaders and cartridge rifles came into vogue, the 6 bore's popularity faded in favour of the larger 4 bore or 2 bore, which became something of an industry standard, as it was a very popular choice of caliber for punt guns.

By the 1880s, the 8 bore was a more practical caliber for elephant hunting, as rifles could be produced with a more manageable size, weight, and recoil, than could be had with the larger 6 bore, 4 bore, or 2 bore cartridges. Despite this, 6 bore cartridge rifles and cartridges could still be purchased. The 6 bore was only made obsolete by the introduction of Nitro Express cartridges chambered in bolt-action rifles and double rifles, beginning in 1898.

=== Prominent users ===
Sir Samuel Baker had a 6 bore made as his first specialist elephant rifle. The percussion rifle, made by the gunmaker, George Gibbs of Bristol in 1840, it weighed 21 lb (9.5 kg) and had a 36 in (0.91 m) barrel with rifling of 2 very deep grooves. This rifle fired a belted 3 oz (85 g) spherical bullet or a 4 oz (110 g) conical bullet with a charge of 16 drams (1 oz (28 g)) of black powder. Baker later wrote of this rifle:

"An extraordinary success attended this rifle, which became my colossal companion for many years in wild sports with dangerous game. It will be observed that the powder charge was one-third the weight of the projectile, and not only a tremendous crushing power, but an extraordinary penetration was obtained, never equalled by any rifle that I have since possessed."

Cigar, the 19th century hottentot elephant hunter who introduced Frederick Selous to elephant hunting, hunted with an old heavy 6 bore muzzleloader.

== See also ==
- List of rimmed cartridges
- Gauge (bore diameter)
- 4 bore
- 8 bore
- .950 JDJ, modern cartridge of similar bore diameter
