= Ball and shot gun =

Shotgun capable of firing shot and bullets

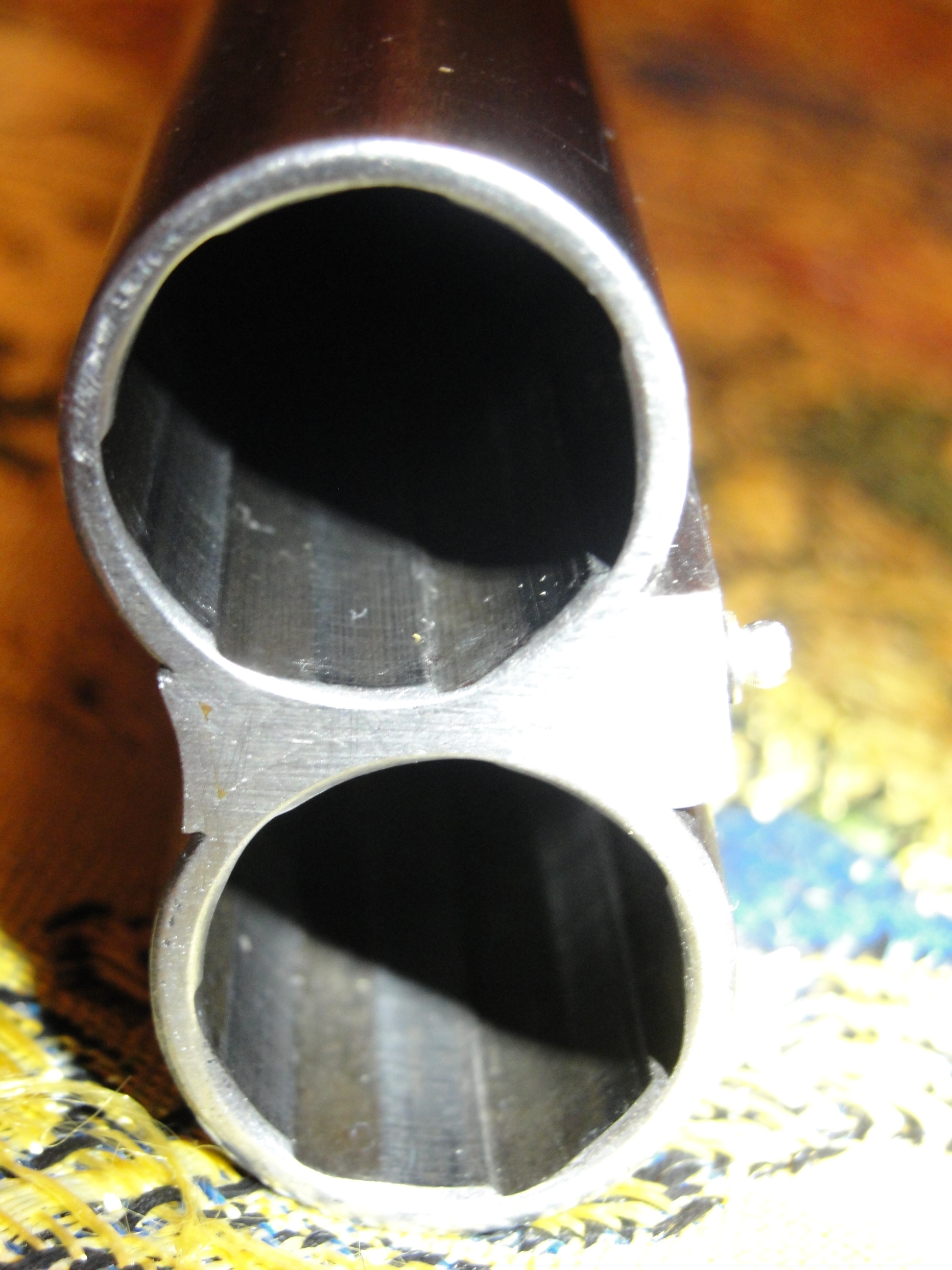
Muzzle of a 12 gauge ball and shot gun

The ball and shot gun, often also known by the marketing name paradox gun, is a shotgun capable of firing both shot and solid projectiles. First built by Holland and Holland, the term paradox is a proprietary name applied to these guns by Holland and Holland.

== Design ==
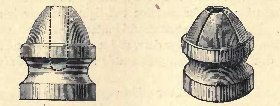
12 bore Paradox gun bullets, Hollow point (left) and Cross cut (right)

Ball and shot guns resemble side by side double-barrelled shotguns, typically with pistol grips and flip up sights. The ball and shot gun has broad, shallow rifling in the chokes of smoothbore shotgun barrels.

Ball and shot retained the ability to fire shotgun shells, whilst being able to fire useful bullets accurately at short ranges, in a gun of manageable weight. A typical 12 bore ball and shot gun weighed 7 to 8 lb (3.2 to 3.6 kg), whilst a fully rifled 12 bore rifle would weigh over 10 lb (4.5 kg). Ball and shot guns were available in a variety of calibres, from 8 bore to 28 bore.

The original 12 bore loading from Holland and Holland fired a 750 gr (49 g) pure lead bullet that was accurate to ranges up to 150 yd (140 m), Westley Richards developed a 12 bore loading that fired a 735 gr (47.6 g) LT-capped (Note: The LT-capped bullet was named after Leslie B Taylor (1863-1930) an engineer and lifelong employee at Westley Richards who, among many inventions, designs and patents, invented the ‘Capped Bullet’, a revolutionary bullet design that allowed for both maximum shock effect whilst ensuring maximum stability and accuracy.) bullet at slightly over 1,300 ft/s (400 m/s) which was accurate to ranges up to 200 yd (180 m).

Westley Richards 20 bore ball and shot guns fired 290 gr (19 g) bullets accurately to 250 yd (230 m), whilst their 28 bore ball and shot guns fired bullets at 1,660 ft/s (510 m/s) at ranges of 300 to 400 yd (270 to 370 m).

== History ==
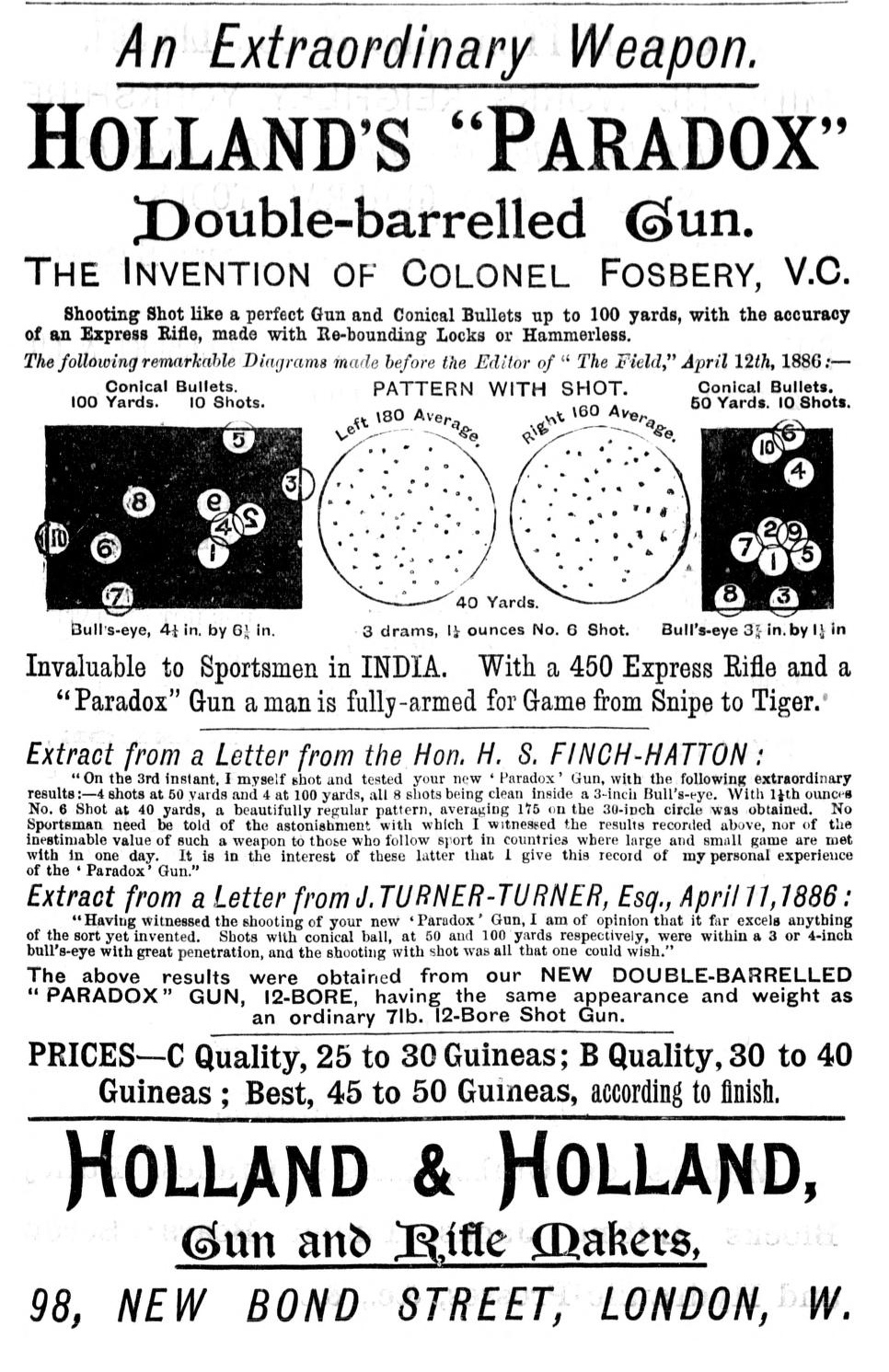
Holland and Holland advertisement (1886)

The ball and shot gun was invented by Colonel George Fosbery, who in 1885 took out the English patent (patent number 7565) for a system of very shallow rifling in the chokes of smoothbore shotgun barrels. Fosbery immediately offered the patent to Holland and Holland, who bought it and from 1886 until 1899, when the patent expired, had exclusive rights to build this class of firearm, marketing it as the Paradox gun.

After the expiry of the patent, most of Britain's larger firearm makers offered similar firearms, some retaining the name paradox gun, others opting for new names such as the Jungle gun, Colindian or Cosmos, although the most famous of these was the Westley Richards' Explora (for 12 bore and above) and Faucita (for 20 bore and 28 bore).

== Use ==
The 8 bore and 10 bore guns were considered suitable for dangerous game, whilst the most common 12 bore was suitable for medium game.

In his work Thirty-seven years of big game shooting in Cooch Behar, the Duars, and Assam, Maharajah Nripendra Narayan of Cooch Behar states the 12 bore Paradox "is an excellent weapon for Tiger, Bear or Leopard at short ranges up to 100 yards."

In his African Rifles and Cartridges, John "Pondoro" Taylor wrote that the 8 bore and particularly the 10 bore ball and shot guns were popular as stand by backups to smaller calibre rifles for lion shooting. He states he used a paradox gun chiefly for shooting leopard, loading one barrel with a 750 gr solid lead bullet and the second with 1.25 oz (35 g) of buckshot.

In his Wild Beasts and Their Ways, Sir Samuel Baker described the 12 bore paradox gun as "a most useful weapon ..... wonderfully accurate within a range of 100 yards" and that "the penetration and shock are most formidable".

Harold G.C. Swayne used an 8 bore paradox gun by Holland & Holland extensively in Africa and India, in his Seventeen trips through Somalialand he states he believed it to be "the best weapon in the market for heavy game such as elephant or rhino."

=== Great War service ===
In the early stages of the First World War, Holland and Holland paradox guns were pressed into service to combat the threat from Zeppelins. Holland and Holland developed a special 12 bore incendiary round, known as the "Holland Buckingham .707 inch Incendiary shell", designed to ignite the airship's hydrogen cells. At least 12 paradox guns were purchased by the Royal Naval Air Service (Note: At the time the Royal Naval Air Service was charged with defending the United Kingdom against the threat posed by Zeppelins.) for use by UK based patrol aircraft and they remained in use until suitable .303 British incendiary ammunition was developed.

== See also ==
- List of multiple-barrel firearms – List of weapons with multiple barrels
- Double-barreled shotgun
- Double rifle
