= Slug (projectile) =

Ballistic projectile

A slug is a term used for a bulky solid ballistic projectile. It is "solid" in the sense of being composed of one piece; the shape can vary widely, including partially hollowed shapes. The term is occasionally applied to bullets (just the projectile, never the cartridge as a whole), but is most commonly applied to one-piece shotgun slugs, to differentiate them from shotshells containing numerous shots. Slugs are commonly fired from un- choked smoothbore barrels, but some specially designed slug barrels have riflings that can impart gyroscopic spin required for in-flight stability.

An airgun slug is a type of pellet more recently developed for pre-charged pneumatic airguns. Unlike the conventional diabolo-shaped pellet, which is aerodynamically poor and relies heavily on drag-stabilisation to maintain accuracy, the slug pellet is cylindro-conoidally shaped like a Minié ball and relies predominantly on spin-stabilisation from a rifled barrel. Because of the greater contact area with the barrel bore, these pellets require more power from the gun to overcome the frictional resistance, and therefore are mainly used in PCP airguns, which generally have much higher muzzle energy ratings than other types of airguns such as spring-piston, pump pneumatic or HPA/CO_{2} airguns.

A water-slug refers to operating a submarine's torpedo tube that has been filled with water rather than a torpedo, thus shooting a "slug of water." In simulated naval battles and exercises this is to represent the dispatch of an actual torpedo as, to sonar detectors, the sounds are very alike.
