= Low brass =

Low brass may refer to:

- Low brass, a copper-zinc alloy
- Low brass, a categorization of brass instruments
- Shotgun shells using a short brass cup.
