= Slug barrel =

Firearm component

A slug barrel is a shotgun barrel that is designed primarily to fire slugs instead of shot, and is usually rifled. A shotgun with such a barrel is often called a slug gun.

== Origins ==
When slugs are fired in a standard, choked barrel, the slug is deformed by the choke as it exits. The degree of deformation is most acute with fuller chokes, which were among the most widely used in stock shotguns up until the 1980s and 1990s. Early shotgun slugs were "rifled" with deformable fins cast into the outside of the soft lead slug, which allowed the slug to swage down to fit the choke. With an open choke, the reduction in diameter is minimal, so accuracy does not suffer much; tighter chokes, however, deform the slug enough to impact accuracy significantly, and the impact of the slug on the choke (at velocities around 450 meters per second (1500 feet per second)) could also stretch the barrel with repeated firings.

== The first slug barrels ==
The first slug barrels were cylinder bore barrels (no choke) outfitted with rifle sights, which are far better suited to accurate shooting of still targets than the standard bead sight used for shooting small, fast moving targets with shot. Most pump-action and semi-automatic shotguns have barrels that can easily be changed in under a minute without tools, so having more than one barrel for a single shotgun is common. With the addition of a slug barrel, the standard shotgun used for bird hunting, skeet, or trap shooting can then be used for hunting medium to large game, such as deer or elk at ranges of over 100 meters (109 yards).

== The rifled slug barrel ==
The next step was the fully rifled shotgun barrel by Hastings, a manufacturer of aftermarket shotgun barrels. Hasting's Paradox shotgun barrels were offered as aftermarket replacements for the most common brands of pump and semi-automatic shotguns and they quickly became popular with slug shooters. Hastings rifled shotgun barrels are designed for firing slugs and are not to be confused with barrels of the Holland & Holland Paradox gun. "Paradox" has been used by Holland & Holland of London since the late 19th century to describe large bore guns with the last few inches of the barrel rifled with a special "ratchet" style of rifling. Holland & Holland purchased the rights to the Paradox gun from the inventor, Col George Vincent Fosbery VC. They chose the name "Paradox" because shotguns are defined by their smoothbore barrels, and a "rifled shotgun" was something of a contradiction in terms. Holland & Holland's Paradox and Nitro-Paradox guns are not slug guns as they fire standard shotgun shells and cartridges with special Paradox bullets fully interchangeably. Under normal circumstances, any firearm with a rifled barrel over 12.7 millimeters (.50 inches) is legally considered a destructive device in the United States. A BATFE ruling was obtained stating that a firearm designed to fire shotgun shells that was converted to fire shotgun slugs with the addition of a rifled barrel was still a shotgun, and thus not a destructive device. Now many manufacturers offer shotguns for sale with rifled barrels already installed. Bolt action and single-shot break-action designs are particularly accurate. With the use of modern saboted slugs designed only for rifled barrels, the modern slug gun offers nearly the accuracy of a typical rifle, though at much shorter ranges.

== New slug technology ==
The widespread availability of rifled shotgun barrels was quickly followed by the introduction of special slugs designed for use with the rifled barrels. The short, fat, unaerodynamic Foster slug was no longer needed for its inherent stability; new slugs were smaller in diameter, usually around 10.16 to 12.7 millimeters (.40 to .50 caliber) (compared to the 18.5 millimeter (.73 inch) bore diameter of a 12 gauge), and carried in a plastic sabot. The saboted slug had half the frontal area of the old slugs, which translated to less drag, and greater penetration. Lighter, faster slugs were also possible, allowing for a flatter trajectory and longer range. With the wide selection of barrels, shotshells and slugs, the modern shotgun is a tremendously versatile tool.

== Shotgun slugs for safety ==
While shotgun slugs were originally developed as a convenience to the hunter who already owned a shotgun and did not want to purchase a rifle for hunting game, many heavily populated jurisdictions now allow large game hunting only with shotguns. The limited range of the slow, heavy slug—even a saboted slug—compared to a rifle bullet offers a safety advantage by limiting the maximum range. While buckshot is capable of taking deer-sized game, it is only effective at short ranges, generally under 50 yards (46 meters). A properly selected barrel and slug load can increase the range to 150 yards (137 meters) or more.

== See also ==
- Glossary of firearms terms
