= List of rimmed cartridges =

Below is a list of rimmed cartridges (R). Although similar, rimmed cartridges differ from rimfire cartridges (list). A rimmed cartridge is a cartridge with a rim, whose primer is located in the center of the case head; the primer is detonated by the firing pin striking that center location. A rimfire cartridge also has a rim, but the primer is located around the rim; the primer is detonated by striking the rim.

== Handgun and Carbine ==
- .22 Hornet
- .22 Remington Jet
- .32 S&W
- .32 S&W Long
- .32 H&R Magnum
- .327 Federal Magnum
- .38 S&W
- .357 Magnum
- .38 Special
- .38-40 Winchester
- .41 Short Colt
- .41 Long Colt
- .41 Special
- .41 Magnum
- .44 Remington Centerfire
- .44 Russian
- .44 S&W American
- .44 Special
- .44 Magnum
- .44-40 Winchester
- .45 Colt
- .45 Auto Rim
- .45 Schofield
- .454 Casull
- .455 Webley
- .475 Linebaugh
- .500 Linebaugh
- .500 S&W Special
- .500 S&W Magnum
- 7.62×38mmR
- 8mm Gasser
- 9mm Japanese revolver
- 10.4mm Swiss Centerfire
- 10.6×25mmR
- 11.3×36mmR

== Shotgun ==
- 2 bore
- 4 bore
- 6 bore
- 8 bore
- 10 bore
- 12 bore
- 16 bore
- 20 bore
- 24 bore
- 28 bore
- 32 bore
- .410 bore
- .360 bore

== Intermediate ==
- .22 Winchester Centerfire
- .222 Rimmed
- .25-20 Winchester
- .32-20 Winchester
- .45-60 Winchester
- .45-70 Government
- .45-75 Winchester
- .50-70 Government
- 10.4×47mmR
- 11x42mmR Albini-Comblain
- 11×50mmR Comblain
- 12x46mmR Musket Spain XPL

== Fully powered ==
- 5.6×57mmR
- 6.5x40R
- 6.5x48R Sauer
- 6.5×53mmR
- 6.5x58R Sauer
- 6,5x65R Sauer
- 6.5x70R Sauer
- 7-30 Waters
- 7.62×53mmR
- 7.62×54mmR
- 8x42R Sauer
- 8x48R Sauer
- 8×50mmR Lebel
- 8×50mmR Mannlicher
- 8×52mmR Mannlicher
- 8×56mmR
- 8x58R Sauer
- 8×58mmR Danish Krag
- 8x72R Sauer
- 9.3×74mmR
- 9×53mmR
- 9x58R Sauer
- 9.3x72R Sauer
- 10x50R Sauer
- 10x55R Sauer
- 10.15×61mmR
- 11×58mmR
- 11×59mmR Gras
- .22 Savage Hi-Power
- .30-30 Winchester
- .30-40 Krag
- .30 R Blaser
- .32 Winchester Special
- .32-40 Ballard
- .38-40 Winchester
- .38-55 Winchester
- .38-72 Winchester
- .40-72 Winchester
- .45-70
- .50-110 Winchester
- .219 Zipper
- .222 Rimmed
- .303 British
- .303 Savage
- .307 Winchester
- .348 Winchester
- .375 Winchester
- .405 Winchester
- .600 Nitro Express

== Autocannon ==
- 20×99mmR
- 20.3×95mmR
- 20×145mmR
- 20×180mmR
- 25×193.5mmR
- 25x205mmR
- 25x187mmR
- 37x57mmR
- 37x94mmR
- 37×145mmR
- 37x190mmR
- 37×223mmR
- 37×249mmR
- 37×250mmR
- 37×254mmR
- 37×258mmR
- 37x268mmR
- 37x380mmR
- 40×158mmR

== Artillery ==
- 40×304mmR
- 40×311mmR
- 47x351mmR
- 57×441mmR
- 57×464mmR
- 75x272mmR
- 75x350mmR
- 76.2×420mmR
- 76.2×583mmR
- 84x295mmR
- 88x292mmR
- 94x92mmR
- 94x206mmR
- 94x675mmR
- 94x857mmR
- 113x640–645mmR
- 114x73-86mmR
- 114x695mmR
- 133x782mmR

== Flare and Riot ==
- 37 mm flare
- 37 mm riot gun

== Blank ==
- .50-120 Federal FireStick
- 5-in-1 blank cartridge
- 9mm x 17 / .380 R

== See also ==
- Wildcat cartridge
- Centerfire ammunition
- List of rebated rim cartridges
- Rim (firearms)
