= 4 bore =

Black powder hunting caliber

- Portrait of Frederick Courteney Selous with his 4 bore single-shot smoothbore gun and African hunting regalia, 1876.
- Type: Rifle or Smoothbore, Heavy Game
- Place of origin: British Empire

Specifications
- Case type: Rimmed, straight
- Bullet diameter: 1 inch (25.4 mm)
- Neck diameter: 1.07 inch (27.15 mm)
- Base diameter: 1.1 inch (28 mm)
- Rim diameter: 1.23 inch (31.3 mm)
- Rim thickness: .06 inch (1.5 mm)
- Case length: 4 inches (101.5mm)
- Overall length: 4.7 inches (119.3 mm )
- Maximum pressure: 36,259 psi (2,500 bar)

Ballistic performance
Bullet mass/type	Velocity	Energy
1,882 gr (122 g) Black Powder	1,300 ft/s (400 m/s)	9,321 ft⋅lbf (12,638 J)
2,000 gr (130 g) Magnum	2,624 ft/s (800 m/s)	30,671 ft⋅lbf (41,584 J)

Four bore or 4 bore is a black powder caliber of the 19th century, used for the hunting of large and potentially dangerous game animals. The specifications place this caliber between the larger 2 bore and the smaller 6 bore rifles. This caliber was the quintessential elephant gun caliber of the black powder safari rifles. The caliber was also used for the Coffman cartridges used for starting large aero engines such as the Rolls-Royce Griffon as used in the later Marks of Supermarine Spitfire.

== Specifications ==
The name, derived from an old English practice of bore measurements in gunmaking, refers to a nominally 4-gauge bore; that is, a bore diameter that would accommodate a pure lead round ball weighing 1/4 of a pound. This would imply a bore diameter of 1.052 inches (26.7 mm); however, in practice the bore diameter varied greatly due to the fact that in the days of muzzleloaders, shotgun gauges were custom made and often differed from the actual bore measurements. Commonly, 4 bores were closer to 0.935–0.955 in (23.7–24.3 mm) calibre, roughly 5 gauge.

== History 1750–1880 ==
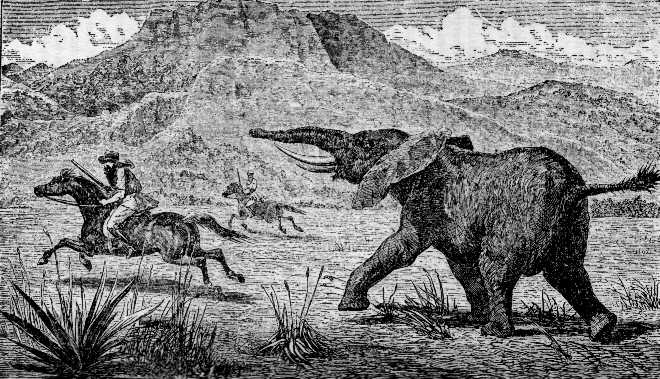
Explorer and big game hunter Samuel Baker chased by an elephant.

As European settlers found early on, their regular muskets were inadequate against dangerous African game. Early gun adaptations were essentially shotguns with extra long (smoothbore) barrels, firing solid balls. By the mid-19th century, the 12, 10, 8, 6, 4, and 2 bore muskets had been strengthened and bulked up for much larger powder charges. At this time, a hunter of dangerous game would fire, gallop away on horseback to a safe distance, reload, and fire again, repeating this process up to 30 times for an African elephant.

The first 4 bores were probably single barrel muzzleloaders converted from British fowling pieces that were, in essence, slug guns. Loads (bullet weights and gunpowder loads) varied greatly. As the weight and strength increased, gunpowder loads went from 8 drams (0.5 oz, 218.75 grains, or 14.17 grams) of powder to a full ounce (16 drams, 437.5 grains, or 28.35 grams). The advent of rifling after about 1860, allowed longer conical projectiles to be stabilised, and, aside from accuracy, these provided even greater weight and penetration, with some hardened lead or steel bullets weighing as much as 2000 grains or 129.6 grams. The 4 bore was also occasionally used for shooting exploding projectiles. Although 4-bore firearms were commonly referred to as "rifles", smoothbore version of the weapon were actually more popular, and remained so throughout the era of 4-bore usage. Since dangerous game was shot at ranges under 50 yd (46 m), a smoothbore was sufficiently accurate, while at the same time providing higher velocities and lower recoil, and needing less cleaning. The prominent British gunmaker W. W. Greener even recommended against rifled barrel firearms above 8-bore and continued producing larger calibers, such as 6, 4, or 2 bores, from then on exclusively with smoothbore barrels. The smoothbore also, at least until the advent of breechloading, could be reloaded faster.

Many famous elephant hunters during the 19th century used such weapons, including George P. Sanderson in India and William Finaughty and Frederick Courteney Selous in Southern Africa. Sanderson, in particular, mentioned two four bore firearms that he used, one of which was rifled while the other was not. Although both weapons were of similar weights, the rifle was built to accommodate only one barrel with a powder charge only five-sixths that of the smoothbore, which was a double-barrel. Sanderson, in fact, discarded the rifle after a misfire of the weapon's charge almost led to his death, and the instance demonstrated the superiority of the smoothbore over the rifle in the case of an oversized firearm in his day in his mind. With the advent of breechloading cartridges in the late 19th century, the 4 bore came into its current guise, that being the well-known 4 to 4.5 in (100 to 110 mm) brass cases.

The brass cartridge cases contained three different types of loads: light at 12 drams, 14 drams at regular, and 16 drams of powder at heavy load. (Note: 1 dram = 27.34375 grains in the avoirdupois system, since 256 drams = 7000 grains = 1 pound of powder. Shotgun shells are still rated in terms of the same archaic dram measurements, relative to their equivalence of smokeless powder load to a black-powder load weighed in drams.) John "Pondoro" Taylor mentioned in his book African Rifles and Cartridges that the 12 drams (328 gr., 3/4 oz., or 21 g.) charge would propel the projectile at around 1,330 ft/s (410 m/s). A double barreled rifle that would fire such a calibre would weigh around 22–24 lb (10.0–10.9 kg) bare, while the single-barreled version would be around 17–18 lb (7.7–8.2 kg). In common practice, the cartridge cases were not typically reloaded, as reliability was of the utmost importance, more important than a possible false cost savings from an attempt at reloading that might cost a hunter his life. Bullet lubrication was typically mostly beeswax based, such that in hot tropical climes there could be no possibility of a bullet lube melting from the base of the bullet, ruining the charge of powder within the cartridge. Reliability was the utmost concern.

=== Golden Age and later usage ===
This caliber was used heavily by the European hunters, notably so the British and Dutch Boers, in tropical climates of Africa and India. A single barreled smoothbore percussion cap musket of between four and six gauge called a "roah" was the standard weapon among Boer hunters, until the common acceptance of breechloading rifles among their ranks in the 1870s. Many of the earliest British hunters adopted this practice from the Boers, with Selous being the best known among them.

Meant to be used with black powder due to its size, it was unpopular due to the problem of thick smoke and a powerful recoil. Notable hunters that used the rifles included Sir Samuel White Baker and Frederick Selous, who used it consistently in his career as an ivory hunter of African elephants between 1874 and 1876 until the advent of the lighter, more accurate and less cumbersome Nitro Express calibers and cordite propellant. In the mid-1870s, Selous favoured a four bore black powder muzzleloader for killing elephant, a 13 lb (5.9 kg) short barreled musket firing a quarter pound bullet with as much as 20 drams (540 grains) of black powder. He could wield it even from horseback. Between 1874 and 1876, he slew seventy-eight elephants with that gun, but eventually there was a double loading incident together with other recoil problems. He finally gave it up, due to it "upsetting my nerve".

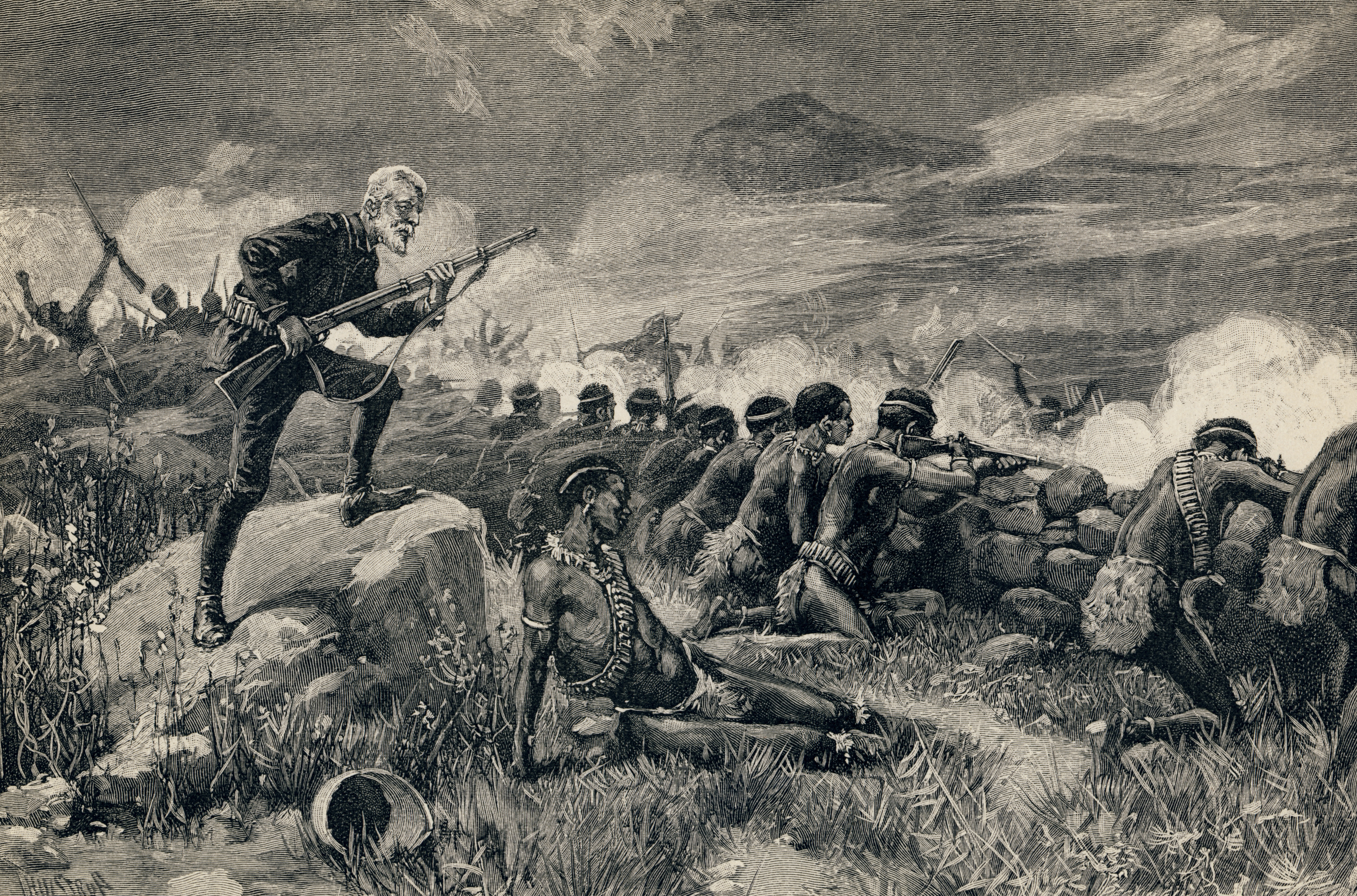
Allan Quatermain, having waited until the last minute while holding his elephant gun, orders his men to fire in this illustration by Thure de Thulstrup from Maiwa's Revenge (1888).

Although a weapon of immense power, the four bore was far less effective than its Nitro Express successors because of the low penetration of its projectiles and its immense recoil. The huge lead slugs fired by the gun were generally capable of stunning a charging African elephant to stop it on its tracks, or turn its charge (causing it to change direction to avoid the hunter) but it was generally unable to kill the creature outright with a frontal brain shot. Chest and broadside shots were effective killers, as was the side shot on brain where the skull is thinner on elephant, however once again this did not help in instantly stopping an enraged elephant thats charging the hunter. On the other dangerous game species such as the Indian elephant, buffalo species and Rhino it was considered an excellent killer.

Henry Morton Stanley carried a 4 bore Farquhson single-shot rifle on his expedition to find David Livingstone.

=== Modern times ===
The "4 bore rifle" caliber's technical data was reissued by C.I.P in 1993. The latest revision of the homologation papers were released by May 15, 2002. This standard and its variations are reflected in obsolete 4 gauge shotgun cartridges and their repurposing as modern 1-inch (25.4 mm) bore flare cartridges.

== See also ==
- List of rimmed cartridges
- 2 bore
- 6 bore
- Double rifle
- Gauge (firearms)
