= Gauge (firearms) =

Internal diameter of the barrel of a firearm

Gauge/Bore
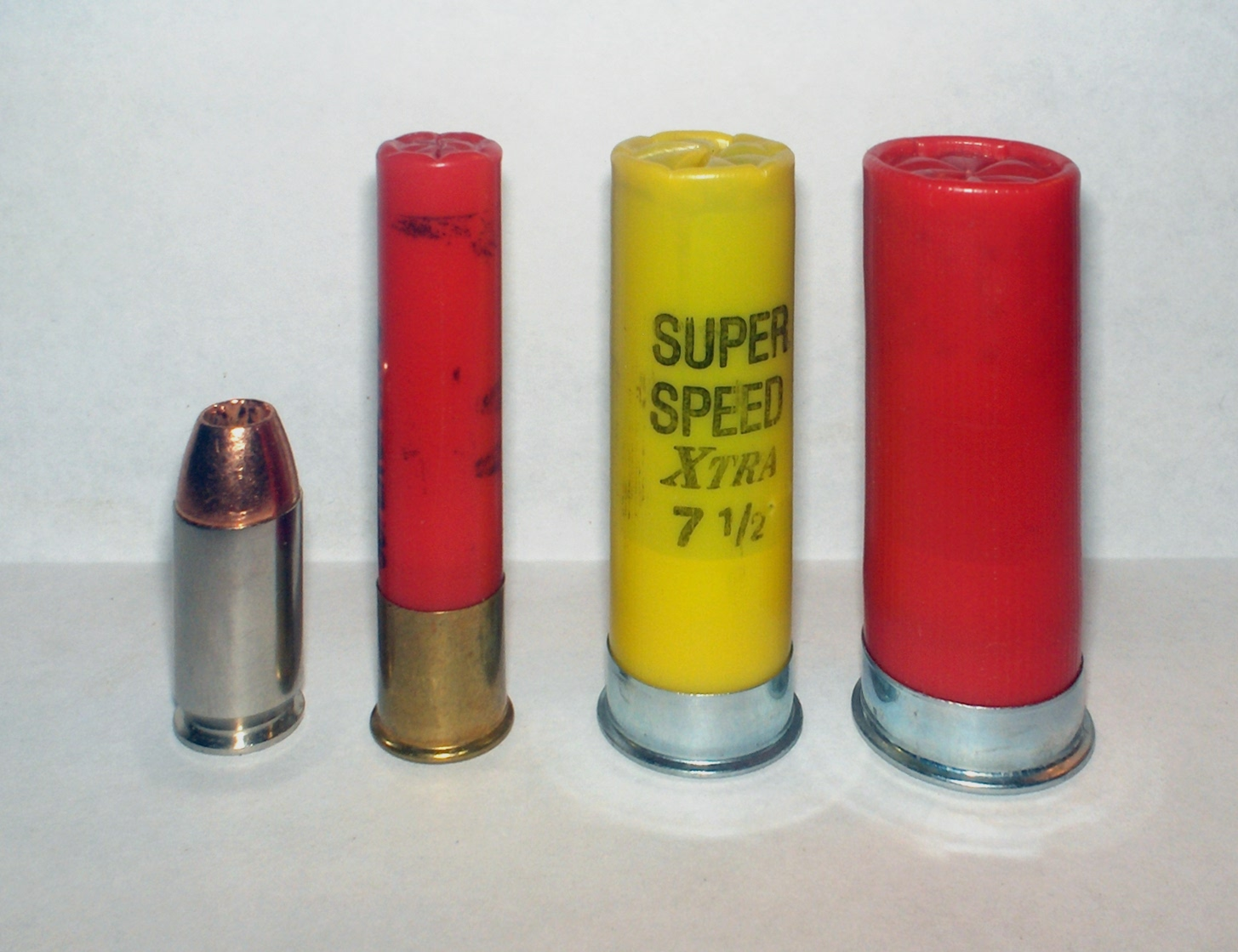
- From left to right; a .45 ACP cartridge, a .410 bore shotshell, a 20-gauge shotshell, and a 12-gauge shotshell
- Type: firearms
- Place of origin: Various

A gauge (in American English; known as a bore in Commonwealth English) (Note: Both can be said in any Anglophone nation, but "gauge" is more common in the U.S. and vice versa.) of a firearm is a unit of measurement used to express the inner diameter (bore diameter) and other necessary parameters to define in general a smoothbore barrel (compare to caliber, which defines a barrel with rifling and its cartridge).

The gauge of a shotgun is a list that includes all necessary data to define a functional barrel. For example, the dimension of the chamber, the shotgun bore dimension, the valid proof load, and commercial ammunition, as defined globally by the C.I.P.; defined in Great Britain by the Rules, regulations and scales applicable to the proof of small arms (2006) of The London Proof House and The Birmingham Proof House, as referred in the Gun Barrel Proof Act 1978, Paragraph 6; and defined in the United States by SAAMI Z299.2 – 2019.

== Historical development ==
Portrait of Frederick Courteney Selous with his 4 bore single-shot Boer rifle and African hunting regalia, 1876

The concept of using a material property to define a bore diameter was used before the term "gauge" in the late 16th century.

The term gauge in connection of firearms was first used in the book A Light to the Art of Gunnery (1677).

Gauge was determined from the weight of a solid sphere of lead that would fit the bore of the firearm and is expressed as the multiplicative inverse of the sphere's mass as a fraction of a pound, e.g., a 1/12 lb (38 g) lead ball fits a 12-gauge bore. Therefore, with a 12-gauge, it would take 12 balls of lead of the same size as the 12-gauge shotgun's inner bore diameter to mass 1 pound (453.6 g). The term is related to the measurement of cannons, which were also measured by the weight of their iron round shot; an eight-pounder would fire an 8-pound (3.6 kg) ball. Therefore, a 12-gauge is larger than a 16-gauge. Since the term was defined in terms of pounds and inches, this implied that for a density of lead in lb_{m}/in^{3} ρ, the formula for the bore diameter in inches b based on the gauge g was:
$$\begin{align}
b &= 2\sqrt[3]{\frac{3}{4\pi g\rho}} &&\approx 2\sqrt[3]{\frac{3}{1.64\pi g}} &&\approx 1.67\sqrt[3]{\frac{1}{g}}\\
\rho &\approx 0.41 \frac{\mathrm{lb}_{\mathrm{m}}}{\mathrm{in}^3}
\end{align}$$

Due to problems defining a pound and getting pure lead, the Gun Barrel Proof Act of 1855 defined a gauge as a list of defined values. As a result, the formula above only works as a heuristic for determining bore diameter from gauge, as the table in the law lists diameters not consistent with any possible density, even after accounting for rounding errors inherent in the table only being precise to a thousandth of an inch.

Gauge is commonly used today in reference to shotguns, though historically it was first used in muzzle-loading long guns such as muskets, then later on in breech-loading long guns including single-shot and double rifles, which were made in sizes up to 2 bore during their heyday in the mid to late 19th century, originally loaded as black powder cartridges. These very large and heavy rifles, called "elephant guns", were intended primarily for use in regions of Africa and Asia to hunt large, dangerous game animals.

Gauge is commonly abbreviated as "ga.", "ga", or "G".

=== Legal Definition ===
The British law that defined the relationship between bore diameter and gauge listed every gauge from 1 to 50. The list here does the same: the number in the list is the gauge. The value to its right is the diameter in inches, as specified in the law. For convenience, the equivalent value in millimetres is provided, but this is not specified in the law.

1. 1.669 in (42.4 mm)
2. 1.325 in (33.7 mm)
3. 1.157 in (29.4 mm)
4. 1.052 in (26.7 mm)
5. .976 in (24.8 mm)
6. .919 in (23.3 mm)
7. .873 in (22.2 mm)
8. .835 in (21.2 mm)
9. .803 in (20.4 mm)
10. .775 in (19.7 mm)
11. .751 in (19.1 mm)
12. .729 in (18.5 mm)
13. .710 in (18.0 mm)
14. .693 in (17.6 mm)
15. .677 in (17.2 mm)
16. .662 in (16.8 mm)
17. .649 in (16.5 mm)
18. .637 in (16.2 mm)
19. .626 in (15.9 mm)
20. .615 in (15.6 mm)
21. .605 in (15.4 mm)
22. .596 in (15.1 mm)
23. .587 in (14.9 mm)
24. .579 in (14.7 mm)
25. .571 in (14.5 mm)
26. .563 in (14.3 mm)
27. .556 in (14.1 mm)
28. .550 in (14.0 mm)
29. .543 in (13.8 mm)
30. .537 in (13.6 mm)
31. .531 in (13.5 mm)
32. .526 in (13.4 mm)
33. .520 in (13.2 mm)
34. .515 in (13.1 mm)
35. .510 in (13.0 mm)
36. .506 in (12.9 mm)
37. .501 in (12.7 mm)
38. .497 in (12.6 mm)
39. .492 in (12.5 mm)
40. .488 in (12.4 mm)
41. .484 in (12.3 mm)
42. .480 in (12.2 mm)
43. .476 in (12.1 mm)
44. .473 in (12.0 mm)
45. .469 in (11.9 mm)
46. .466 in (11.8 mm)
47. .463 in (11.8 mm)
48. .459 in (11.7 mm)
49. .456 in (11.6 mm)
50. .453 in (11.5 mm)

== Bore sizing ==
Since shotguns were not originally intended to fire solid projectiles, but rather a compressible mass of shot, the actual diameter of the bore can vary. The fact that most shotgun bores are not cylindrical also causes deviations from the ideal bore diameter.

The chamber of the gun is larger to accommodate the thickness of the shotshell walls, and a "forcing cone" in front of the chamber reduces the diameter down to the bore diameter. The forcing cone can be as short as a fraction of an inch, or as long as a few inches on some firearms. At the muzzle end of the barrel, the choke can constrict the bore even further, so measuring the bore diameter of a shotgun is not a simple process, as it must be done away from either end.

Shotgun bores are commonly "overbored" or "backbored", meaning that most of the bore (from the forcing cone to the choke) is slightly larger than the value given by the formula. This is claimed to reduce felt recoil and improve patterning. The recoil reduction is due to the larger bore producing a slower acceleration of the shot, and the patterning improvements are due to the larger muzzle diameter for the same choke constriction, which results in less shot deformation. A 12-gauge shotgun, nominally 18.5 mm (0.73 in), can range from a tight 18 mm (0.71 in) to an extreme overbore of 20 mm (0.79 in). Some also claim an increased velocity with the overbored barrels, up to 15 m/s (49 ft/s), which is due to the larger swept volume of the overbored barrel. Once only found in expensive custom shotguns, overbored barrels are now becoming common in mass-marketed guns. Aftermarket backboring is also commonly performed to reduce barrel weight and shift the center of mass backward for better balance. Factory overbored barrels generally have a larger outside diameter and will not have this weight reduction, though they are tougher because they have a normal barrel wall thickness.

Firing slugs from overbored barrels can result in very inconsistent accuracy, as the slug may be incapable of obturating to fill the oversized bore.

== Gauges in use ==
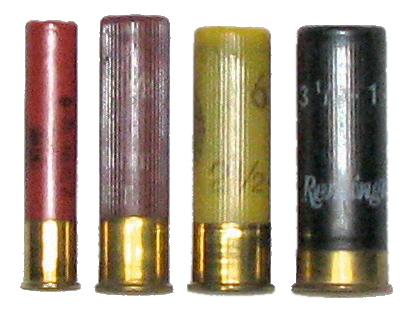
Left to right: .410 bore, 28-gauge, 20-gauge, and 12-gauge shotgun shells

Shotgun gauges still in modern production include, in descending order of size, 10 gauge, 12 gauge, 16 gauge, 20 gauge, 24 gauge, 28 gauge, 32 gauge (sometimes called 14 millimeter or 32 bore), and .410 bore. By far, the most popular is the 12 gauge, followed by 20 gauge, particularly in the United States.

Shotguns and shells exceeding 10 gauge, such as the 8 gauge, 7 gauge, 6 gauge, 4 gauge, 3 gauge and 2 gauge, are historically important in the United Kingdom and elsewhere in mainland Europe. Today, they are almost exclusively made by custom order or handloaders. These shells are usually black powder paper or brass cartridges, as opposed to modern smokeless powder plastic or wax cartridges.

The 18-, 15-, 11-, 6-, 3-, and 2-gauge shells are the rarest of all; owners of these types of rare shotguns will usually have their ammunition custom-loaded by a specialist in rare and custom bores. The 14 gauge has not been loaded in the United States since the early 20th century, although the 2 9/16-inch (65 mm) hull is still made in France. The smaller 24 and 32 gauges are still produced and used in some European and South American countries and are commonly available for purchase via most online ammunition vendors in the United States. Punt guns, which use very large shells, are rarely encountered.

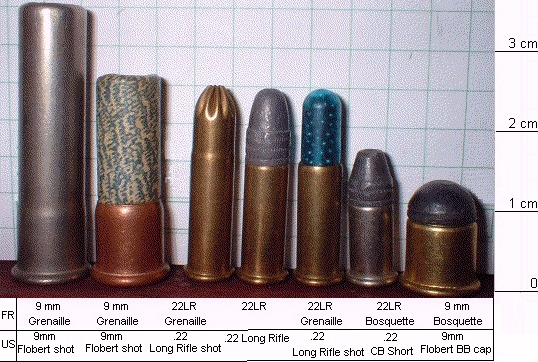
Garden gun calibers: 9mm Flobert shot, 9mm Flobert shot, .22 Long Rifle shot, .22 Long Rifle, .22 Long Rifle shot, .22 CB Short, and 9mm Flobert BB cap

Also seen in limited numbers are smoothbore firearms in calibers smaller than .360, such as .22 long rifle (UK No. 1 bore) and 9mm Flobert rimfire (UK No. 3 bore), designed for short-range pest control and garden guns. The No. 2 bore (7 mm) has long been obsolete. All three of these rimfires are available in shot and BB-cap.

=== Gauge and shot type ===
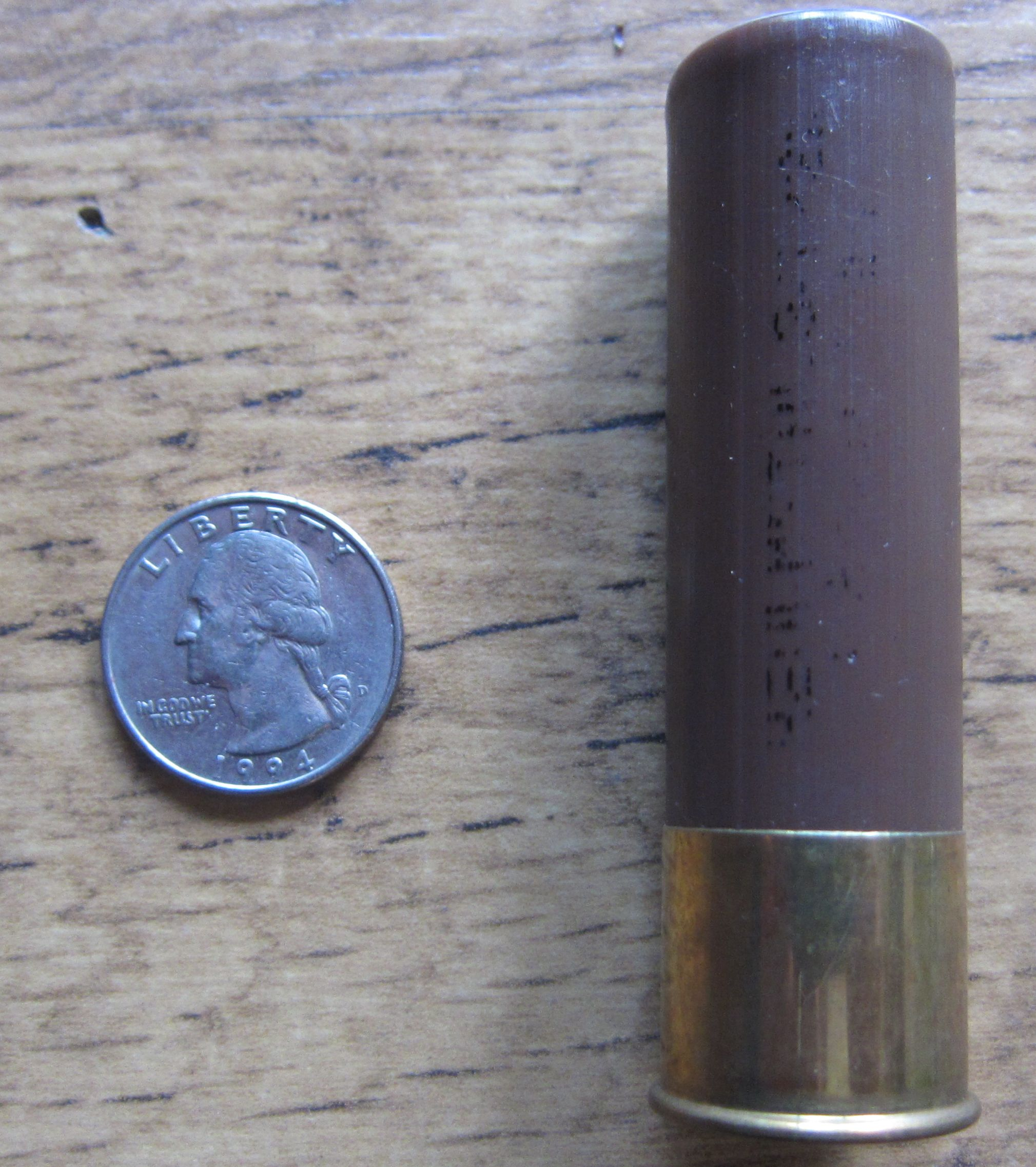
A 10-gauge (3 1/2-inch (89 mm)) shotgun shell shown next to a United States quarter

The 10 gauge narrowly escaped obsolescence when steel and other nontoxic shot became required for waterfowl hunting, since the larger shell could hold the much larger sizes of low-density steel shot needed to reach the ranges necessary for waterfowl hunting. The move to steel shot reduced the use of 16- and 20-gauge shells for waterfowl hunting, and the shorter, 2 3/4-inch (70 mm), 12-gauge shells as well. However, the 3 1/2-inch (89 mm) 12-gauge shell, with its higher SAAMI pressure rating of 14,000 psi (97 MPa) compared to standard 2 3/4-inch (70 mm) and 3-inch (76 mm) 12-gauge shells with their lower pressure rating of 11,500 psi (79 MPa), began to approach the performance of the 3 1/2-inch (89 mm) 10-gauge shells with a pressure rating of 11,000 psi (76 MPa). Newer nontoxic shots, such as bismuth or tungsten-nickel-iron alloys, and even tungsten-polymer blends, regain much or all of the performance loss, but are much more expensive than steel or lead shot.
