= 2 bore =

Black powder hunting caliber

Two bore or 2 bore is an obsolete firearm caliber.

== Specifications ==
Two bore firearms generally fire spherical balls or slugs made of hardened lead, or in the case of a modern metallic cartridge with either solid brass or bronze projectiles. The nominal bore is 1.326 inches (33.7 mm), and projectiles generally weigh 8 ounces (227 grams; 3500 grains). The velocity is relatively low, at around 1,500 feet per second (460 m/s) at the muzzle, but develops approximately 17,500 ft⋅lbf (23,700 J) muzzle energy.

According to William Wellington Greener, the Eley Brothers Limited company produced 2 bore paper cases, but the bullet caliber and power charge—and subsequently performance—were practically equivalent of a thin brass-cased 4 bore cartridge, while being less waterproof.

== History and background ==
2 bore guns were manufactured for hunting waterfowl, but due to their weight and hefty recoil, hunters preferred using smaller guns, such as single-barreled 4 bore or double-barreled 10 bore guns, or 12 gauge shotguns.

Before the advent of Nitro Express cartridges in 1898, ivory poachers used large caliber elephant guns ranging from 2 to 4 bore that could weight up to 25 pounds (11 kg) and were carried by a team of porters and fired solid lead balls; These were the only suitable weapons for big-game hunting as existing black powder rimfire cartridges were barely adequate for medium-sized game and firearm locking systems weren't capable of withstanding the pressure generated by high-powered cartridges. While some authors— including W. D. M. Bell—describe Sir Samuel Baker's "Baby" rifle as a 2 bore, author Terry Wieland describes the Baby as a 3 bore rifle that fired a 5 oz (140 g, 2,200 gr) shell.

According to an anonymous account from an English mercenary who served with the Transvaal Republic, during a border skirmish with Swaziland, the opposing side employed a team of three men to operate a single 2 bore elephant gun, which reportedly caused several casualties in the Boer ranks:

First of all, they loaded the gun up to the muzzle with scraps of iron, stone, nails, and any rubbish of a like nature that came to hand; then the first Swazi held it lightly to his shoulder, while the second propped him up behind to stop the recoil. Number three gunner stepped up when the other two were in position, and as the lock and trigger were out of order he just touched the charge off with a match. Every time this antiquated blunderbuss was fired the three Swazis were sent sprawling, but the execution done in our ranks by this original method of firing an otherwise useless gun was greater than all the rest of the Swazi fire put together.

== Schroeder & Hetzendorfer cartridge ==
Schroeder & Hetzendorfer 2 bore metallic cartridge
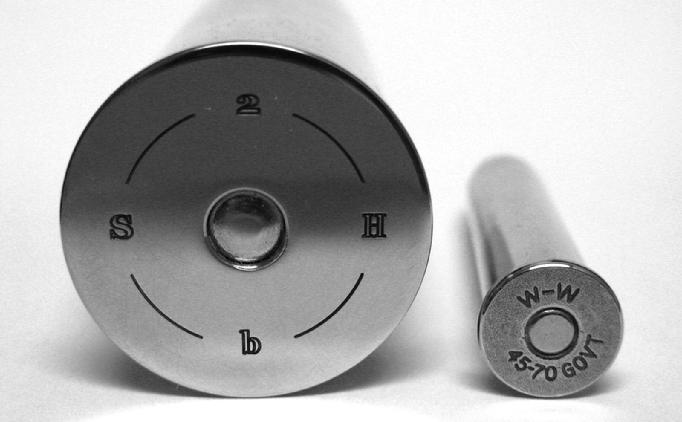
- 2-bore and .45-70
- Type: Rifle
- Place of origin: United States

Production history
- Designer: Rudolph Schroeder
- Manufacturer: Schroeder & Hetzendorfer LLC
- Variants: 2

Specifications
- Parent case: Proprietary
- Case type: Semi-rimmed, straight
- Bullet diameter: 1.326 in (33.7 mm)
- Rim diameter: 1.490 in (37.8 mm)
- Rim thickness: .125 in (3.2 mm)
- Case length: 3.50 in (89 mm)
- Case capacity: 935 gr H_{2}O (60.6 cm^{3})
- Rifling twist: 1 in 48 in (1219.2 mm)
- Primer type: CCI #35
- Filling weight: 700 gr (45 g) ffg

Ballistic performance
Bullet mass/type	Velocity	Energy
3,500 gr (227 g) Brass FNTC solid	1500 ft/s	17,500 J (12,900 ft⋅lbf)
3,350 gr (217 g) Lead round ball	1200 ft/s	10,700 J (7,900 ft⋅lbf)
2,500 gr (162 g) Bronze FN solid	1450 ft/s	11,670 J (8,610 ft⋅lbf)
- Test barrel length: 28"; Sources: Design and test data

== See also ==
- List of rimmed cartridges
- 4 bore
- Gauge (bore diameter)
- Holland & Holland
