= Shot (pellet) =

Type of ammunition

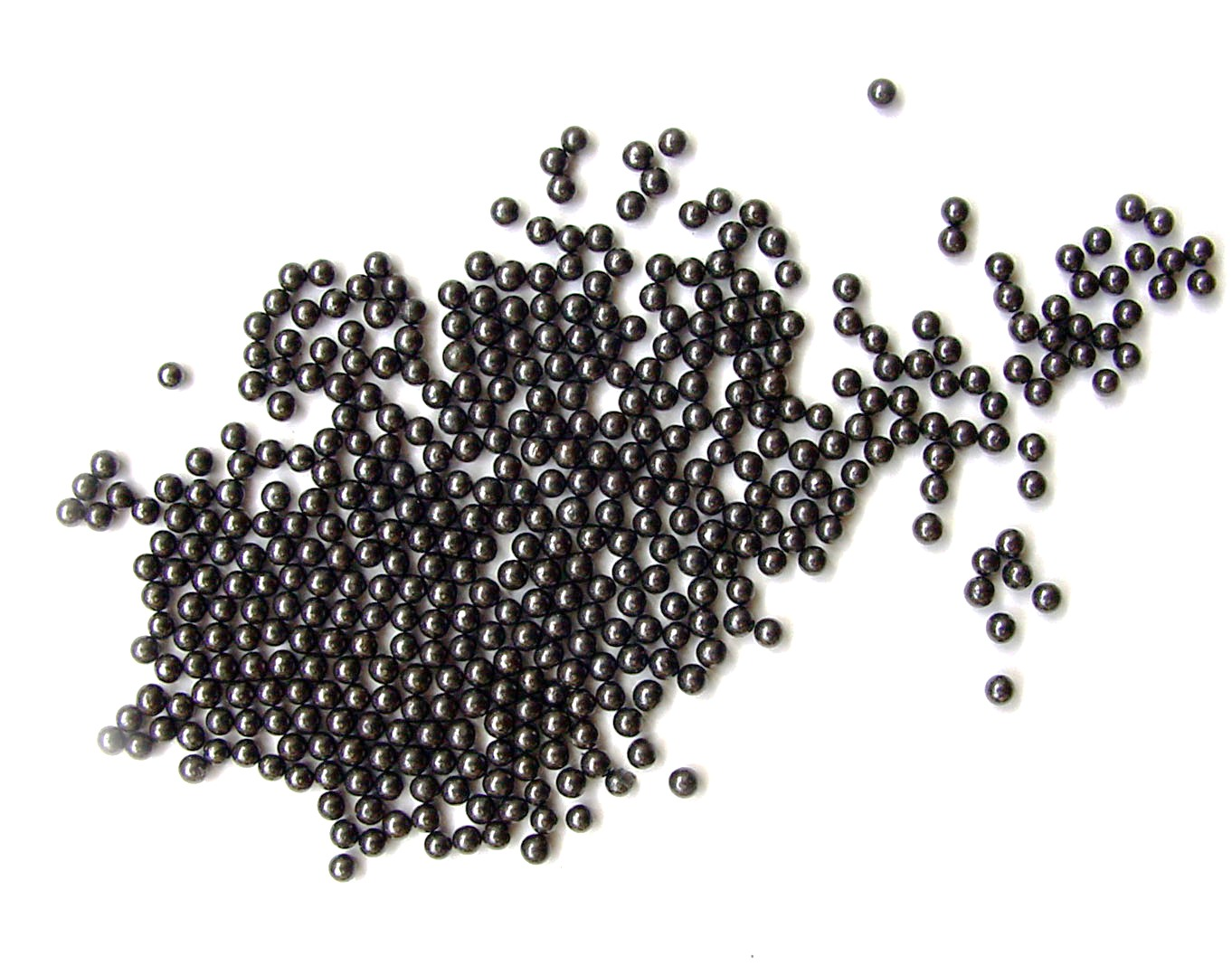
Lead shot

Shot is a collective term for small spheres or pellets, often made of lead. These have been projected from slings since ancient times and were the original projectiles for shotguns and are still fired primarily from shotguns and grenade launchers, while they are less commonly used in riot guns. Shot shells are also available in many handgun calibers in a configuration known as "birdshot", "rat shot", or "snake shot".

Lead shot is also used for a variety of other purposes such as filling cavities with dense material for weight and/or balance. Some versions may be plated with other metals. Lead shot was originally made by pouring molten lead through screens into water, forming what was known as "swan shot", and, later, more economically mass-produced at higher quality using a shot tower. The Bliemeister method has supplanted the shot tower method since the early 1960s.

== Manufacture ==
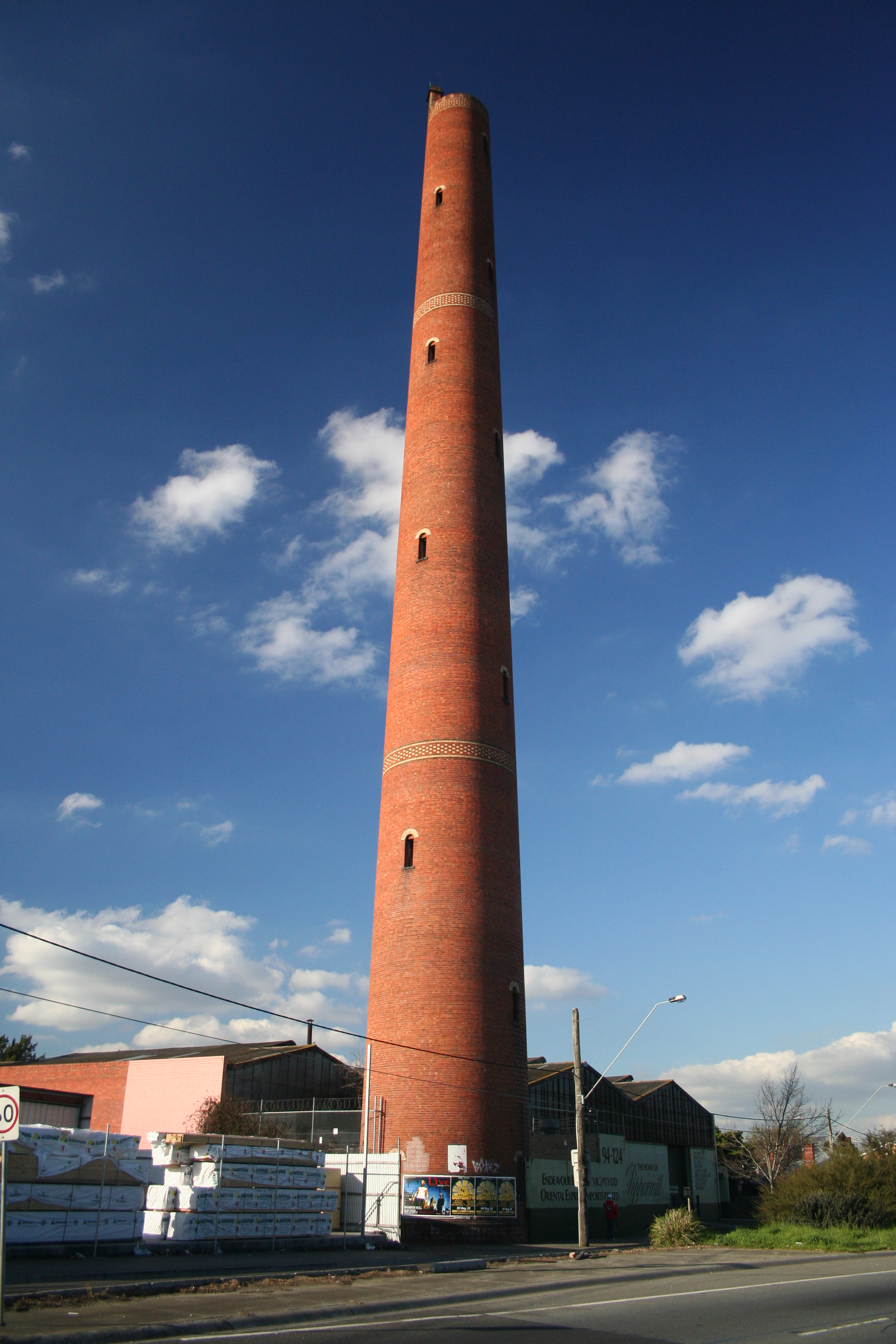
Shot tower at Clifton Hill, Melbourne, Australia

Producing lead shot using a shot tower was pioneered in the late 18th century by William Watts of Bristol, who adapted his house on Redcliffe Hill by adding a three-storey tower and digging a shaft under the house through the caves underneath to achieve a sufficient drop height. The process was patented in 1782. The process was later brought above ground through the building of shot towers.

Molten lead would be dropped from the top of the tower. Like most liquids, surface tension makes drops of molten lead become near-spherical as they fall. When the tower is high enough, the lead droplets will solidify during the fall and thus retain their spherical form. Water is usually placed at the bottom of the tower, cooling the lead immediately upon landing.

Roundness of manufactured shot produced from the shot tower process is graded by forcing the newly produced shot to roll accurately down inclined planes. Unround shot will naturally roll to the side, for collection. The unround shot was either re-processed in another attempt to make round shot using the shot tower again, or used for applications which did not require round shot (e.g., split shot for fishing).

Various hardnesses of the shot can be obtained by using lead alloys containing carefully controlled amounts of tin, antimony, and arsenic. Different alloys also have different melting points. Hardness is also controlled by the rate of cooling.

The Bliemeister method, named after inventor Louis W. Bliemeister of Los Angeles, California, (U.S. patent 2,978,742, dated April 11, 1961) is a process for making lead shot in small sizes from about #7 to about #9. In this process, molten lead is dripped from small orifices and falls approximately 1 inch (2.5 cm) into a hot liquid, where it then rolls along an incline and then drops another 3 feet (90 cm). The temperature of the liquid controls the cooling rate of the lead, while the surface tension of the liquid and the inclined surface(s) work together to bring the small droplets of lead into a highly regular spherical shape. The size of the lead shot that is produced is determined by the amount of lead in each original drip. The diameter of the orifice used to drip the lead has an effect, ranging from approximately 0.018 inches (0.46 mm) for #9 lead shot to about 0.025 inches (0.64 mm) for #6 or #7 shot, as does the specific lead alloy that is used.

The roundness of the lead shot depends on the angle of the inclined surfaces as well as the temperature of the liquid coolant. Various coolants have successfully been used, ranging from diesel fuel to antifreeze and water-soluble oil. After the lead shot cools, it is washed, then dried, and small amounts of graphite are finally added to prevent clumping of the lead shot. Lead shot larger than about #5 tends to clump badly when fed through tubes, even when graphite is used, whereas lead shot smaller than about #6 tends not to clump when fed through tubes when graphite is used.

Lead shot dropped quickly into liquid cooling baths when being produced from molten lead is known as "chilled lead shot", in contrast to "soft lead shot" which is produced by molten lead not being dropped as quickly into a liquid cooling bath. The process of rapidly chilling lead shot during its manufacturing process causes the shot to become harder than it would otherwise be if allowed to cool more slowly. Hence, chilled lead shot, being harder and less likely to deform during firing, is preferred by shotgunners for improving shot pattern densities at longer (> 30 yards (27 m)) ranges, whereas soft lead shot, being softer and more likely to deform during firing, is preferred for improving shot pattern densities at very close (< 20 yards (18 m)) ranges as the softer and now deformed shot scatters more quickly when fired. Soft lead shot is also more readily deformed during the firing process by chokes.

The manufacture of non-lead shot differs from that of lead, with compression molding used to create some alloys.

== Sizes ==
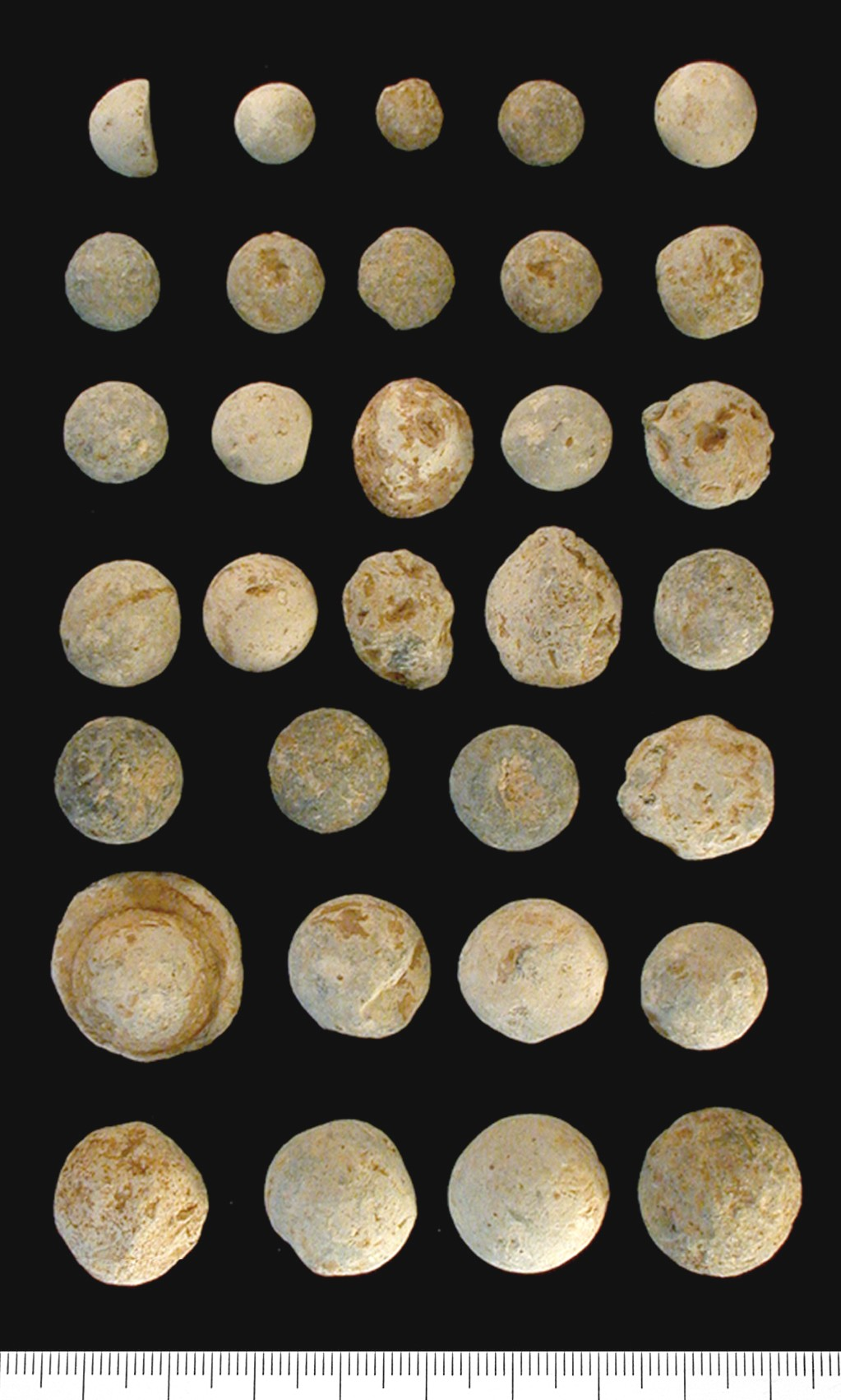
Selection of post-medieval lead shot

Shot is available in many sizes for different applications. The size of numbered shot decreases as the number increases. In hunting, some sizes are traditionally used for certain game, or certain shooting situations, although there is overlap and subjective preference. The range at which game is typically encountered and the penetration needed to assure a clean kill must both be considered. Local hunting regulations may also specify a size range for certain game. Shot loses its velocity very quickly due to its low sectional density and ballistic coefficient (see external ballistics). Generally, larger shot carries farther, and does not spread out as much as smaller shot.

=== Buckshot ===
Buckshot is a shot formed to larger diameters so that it can be used against bigger game such as deer, moose, or caribou. Sizes range in ascending order from size #B (0.17 in, 4.32 mm) to Tri-Ball. It is usually referred by the size, followed by "buck", e.g. "#000" is referred to as "triple-aught buck" in the United States or "triple-o buck" in other English speaking countries. Buckshot is traditionally swaged (in high volume production) or cast (in small volume production). The Bliemeister method does not work for shot larger than #5 (0.12 in, 3.05 mm), and works progressively poorly for shot sizes larger than about #6.

=== Lead shot comparison chart ===
Below is a chart with diameters per pellet and weight for idealized lead spheres for U.S. Standard Designations with a comparison to English shot sizes.

U.S. Size	U.K. Size	Type	Mass (grains)	Pellets per oz (lead)	Pellets per oz (steel)	Diameter (in)	Diameter (mm)
0000		Buck	82			0.38	9.65
000½		Buck	76			0.37	9.4
000	LG	Buck	70	6	n/a	0.36	9.14
	MG (mould)	Buck	62.5	7	n/a	0.347	8.81
00½		Buck	59			0.34	8.64
	SG	Buck	54.7	8	n/a	0.332	8.43
00		Buck	53.8	8		0.33	8.38
0		Buck	49	9		0.32	8.13
#1½		Buck	44.7			0.31	7.87
#1		Buck	40.5	10		0.30	7.62
	Special SG	Buck	39.8	11	n/a	0.298	7.57
#2½		Buck	36.6			0.29	7.37
#2		Buck	29.4	14		0.27	6.86
	SSG	Buck	29.17	15	n/a	0.269	6.83
#3½		Buck	26.3			0.26	6.6
#3		Buck	23.4	18		0.25	6.35
	SSSG	Buck	21.89	20	n/a	0.245	6.22
#4		Buck	20.7	21		0.24	6.1
FF		Waterfowl	18.2			0.23	5.84
	SSSSG	Buck	17.50	25	n/a	0.227	5.77
F (or TTT)		Waterfowl	16.0			0.22	5.59
	SSSSSG or AAAA	Buck/ Waterfowl	14.58	30	n/a	0.214	5.44
TT		Waterfowl	13.9	~31		0.21	5.33
	AAA	Waterfowl	12.5	35	n/a	0.203	5.16
T		Waterfowl	12.0	n/a	53	0.20	5.08
	AA	Waterfowl	10.94	40	n/a	0.194	4.93
BBB		Waterfowl	10.2	n/a	61	0.19	4.83
BB	A or BBBB	Waterfowl	8.75	50	72	0.18	4.57
B	BBB	Waterfowl	7.29 – 7.40	60	86	0.17	4.32
	BB	Waterfowl	6.25	70	n/a	0.161	4.09
#1	B	Waterfowl	5.47	80	103	0.154	3.91
#2		Waterfowl	4.86	90	125	0.15	3.81
	#1	Waterfowl	4.38	100	n/a	0.143	3.63
#3	#2	Waterfowl	3.65	120	154	0.135	3.43 – 3.56
#4		Waterfowl	3.24	135	192	0.13	3.3
	#3	Waterfowl	3.12	140	n/a	0.128	3.25
#4½		Bird	2.90			0.125	3.18
#5	#4	Bird	2.57	170	243	0.12	3.05
	#4½	Bird	2.19	200	n/a	0.113	2.87
#6	#5	Bird	1.94 – 1.99	220 – 225	317	0.11	2.79
	#5½ (m.g.)	Bird	1.82	240	n/a	0.107	2.72
	#6	Bird	1.62	270	n/a	0.102	2.59
#7	#6½	Bird	1.458	300	420	0.10	2.54
	#7	Bird/Clay	1.29	340	n/a	0.095	2.41
#7½		Bird/Clay	1.25	350	490	0.095	2.413
#8		Bird/Clay	1.067	410	577	0.09	2.286
#8½	#8	Bird/Clay	0.97	450	n/a	0.085 – 0.087	2.16 – 2.21
#9	#9	Bird/Clay	0.748	580 – 585	n/a	0.08	2.032
#9½		Bird/Clay	0.63			0.075	1.91
#10	#10	Pest	0.51	850	n/a	0.07	1.78
	#11	Pest	0.42	1,040	n/a	0.066	1.68
	#12	Pest	0.35	1,250	n/a	0.062	1.57
#11		Pest	0.32			0.06	1.52
#12		Pest	0.183	2,385	n/a	0.05	1.27
	Dust	Pest	0.17	2,600	n/a	0.048	1.22
Dust		Pest	0.10 or less			0.04	1.02

== Applications outside firearms ==
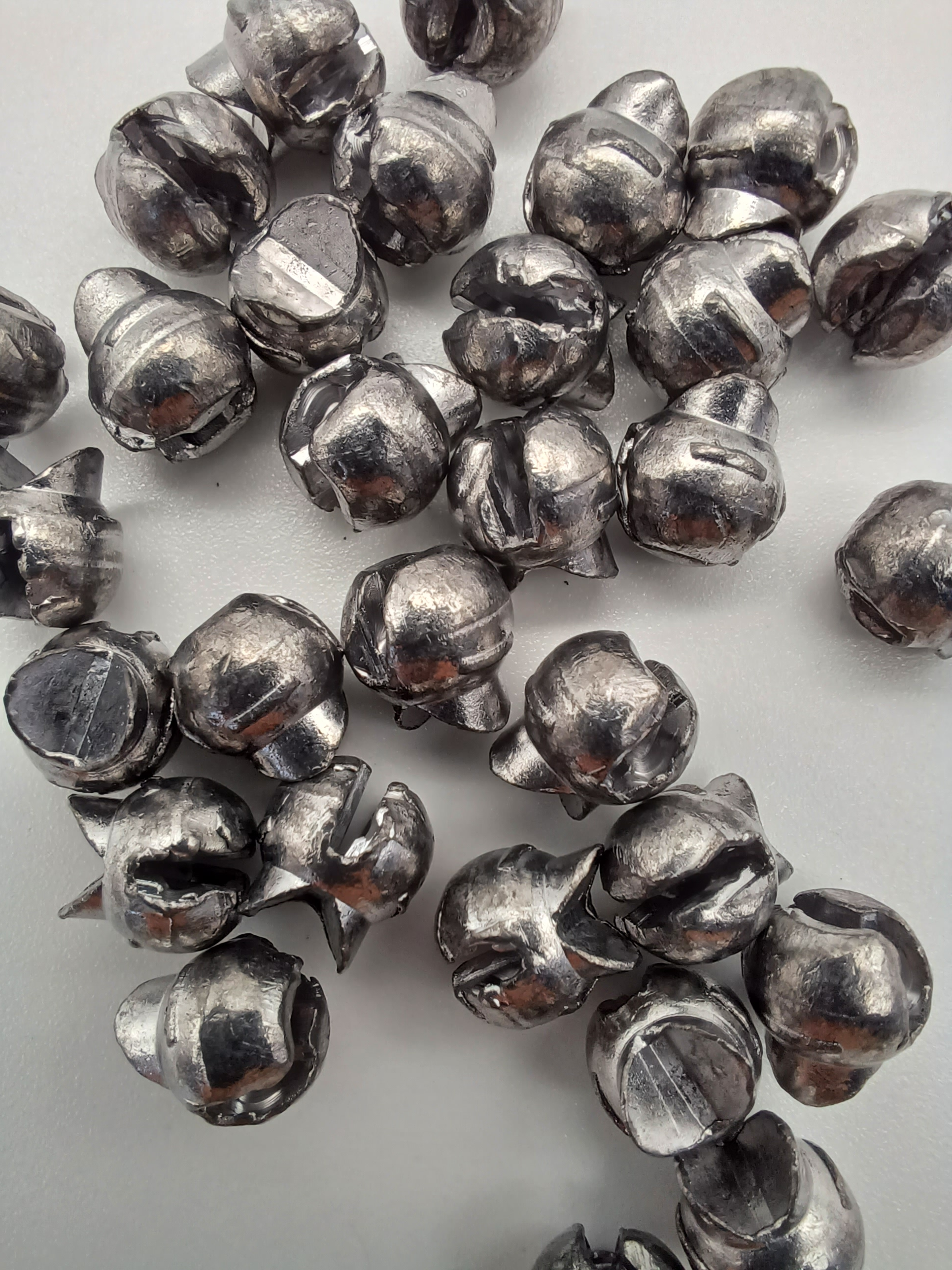
Split shot, used for fishing

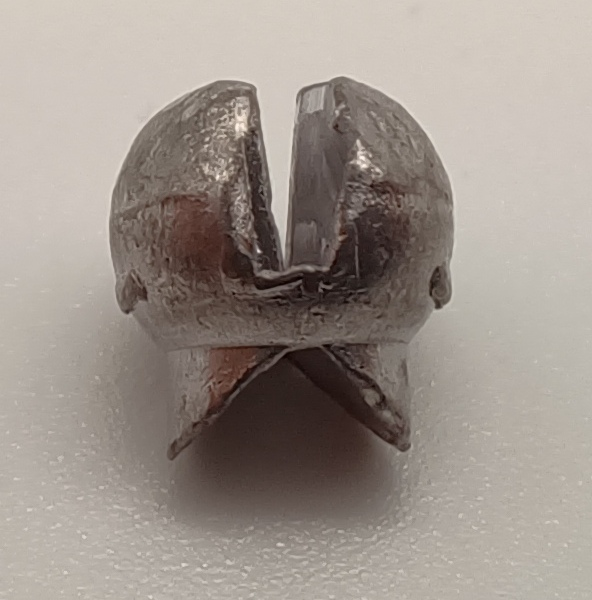
Split shot close-up

When used as a pourable/mouldable weight, lead shot may be left loose, or mixed with a bonding agent such as epoxy to contain and stabilize the pellets after they are poured.

Some applications of lead shot are:

- As ballast in various situations, especially where a dense, pourable weight is required. Generally, small shot is best for these applications, as it can be poured more like a liquid. Completely round shot is not required.
- Stress testing: Providing variable weights in strength-of-materials stress-testing systems. Shot pours from a hopper into a basket, which is connected to the test item. When the test item fractures, the chute closes and the mass of the lead shot in the basket is used to calculate the fracture stress of the item.
- Hydrometers: use a weight made of shot, since the weight has to be poured into a narrow glass vessel.
- Split shot, a larger type of lead shot where each pellet is cut part-way through the diameter. This type of shot was formerly commonly used as a line weight in angling. They are no longer solely manufactured from lead but instead are often made from softer materials that can be easily pressed onto the fishing line instead of being closed in a crimp using pliers, as was once common.
- The heads of some dead blow hammers are filled with shot to minimize rebound off the struck surface.
- Shot belt: some scuba diving weight belts contain pouches filled with lead shot.
- Many blackjacks and saps use lead shot as a flexible weight to deliver high energy blows while minimizing damage from sharp impact force (similar to the way it is used in dead blow hammers).
- Loudspeaker stands can be filled with lead shot for additional acoustic decoupling, as well as stability.
- Model rocketry: to add weight to the nose of the rocket, increasing the stability factor.
- Due to its heat capacity and low thermal conductivity at low temperatures, lead shot has been used as a suitable material for a regenerator in Stirling engines and thermoacoustic cryocoolers.
- Due to lead's high density, it is used to attenuate radiation, especially X-rays and gamma rays. Lead shot may be enclosed in a vest, blanket, or bag that is placed around a point source for radiation shielding.

== Bird lead poisoning ==
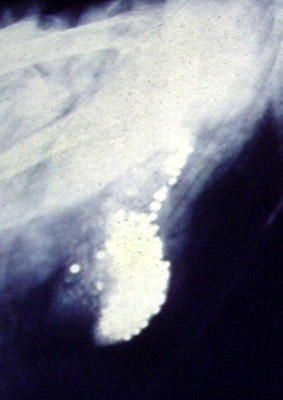
X-ray of lead shot accumulated in the gizzard of a dead swan

Lead shot-related waterfowl poisonings were first documented in the US in the 1880s; by 1919, the spent lead pellets from waterfowl hunting were positively identified as a major source of deaths of bottom-feeding waterfowl. Once ingested, stomach acids and mechanical action cause the lead to break down and be absorbed into the body and bloodstream, resulting in death. "If a bird swallows only one pellet, it usually survives, although its immune system and fertility are likely to be affected. Even low concentrations of lead have a negative impact on energy storage, which affects the ability to prepare for migration." Upland game birds such as mourning doves, ring-necked pheasants, wild turkey, northern bobwhite quail and chukars can also ingest lead and thus be poisoned when they feed on seeds.

Lead from spent ammunition also impacts scavenging bird species such as vultures, ravens, eagles and other birds of prey. Foraging studies of the endangered Californian condor have shown that avian scavengers consume lead fragments in gut piles left in the field from harvested big game animals, as well as by the consumption of small game, or "pest animal," carcasses that have been shot with lead-core ammo, but not retrieved. Not all lead exposure in these circumstances leads to immediate mortality, but multiple sub-lethal exposures result in secondary poisoning impacts, which eventually lead to death. Among condors around the Grand Canyon, lead poisoning because of eating lead shot is the most frequently diagnosed cause of death.

=== Restrictions on the use of lead ===
Alternatives to lead shot are mandated for use by hunters in certain locations or when hunting migratory waterfowl and migratory birds or when hunting within federal waterfowl production areas, wildlife refuges, or some state wildlife management areas. Shot pellets used in waterfowl hunting must be lead-free in the United States, Canada, and in the European Union.

Lead shot is also banned within an eight-county area in California designated as the condor's range. As of 2011, thirty-five states prohibited lead shot use in such specially-specified areas when hunting. In an effort to protect the condor, the use of projectiles containing lead has been banned for hunting wild boar, deer, antelope, elk, pronghorn, antelope, coyote, squirrel, and other non-game wildlife in areas of California designated as its habitat range. The bald eagle has similarly been shown to be affected by lead originating from dead or wounded waterfowl—the requirement to protect this species was one of the biggest factors behind laws being introduced in 1991 by the United States Fish and Wildlife Service to ban lead shot in migratory waterfowl hunting.

Hunting restrictions have also banned the use of lead shot while hunting migratory waterfowl in at least 29 countries across by international agreement, for example the Agreement on the Conservation of African-Eurasian Migratory Waterbirds. Depending on hunting laws, alternatives to lead shot are mandated for use by hunters in some locations when hunting migratory birds, notably waterfowl. In the US, the restrictions are limited to migratory waterfowl, while Canadian restrictions are wider and apply (with some exceptions) to all migratory birds. The hunting of upland migratory birds such as mourning doves was specifically excluded from the 1991 US restrictions as scientific evidence did not support their contribution to the poisoning of bald eagles. In 1985, Denmark banned the use of lead in wetlands covered by the Ramsar Convention, later expanding this restriction to the whole country. The use of lead has been banned for all hunting activities in the Netherlands as of 1992.

The Missouri Department of Conservation introduced regulations in 2007 in some hunting areas requiring the use of non-toxic shot to protect upland birds. Some clay pigeon ranges in the US have banned the use of lead after elevated levels of lead were found in waterfowl, small birds, mammals and frogs in their vicinity.

=== Non-toxic alternatives to lead shot ===
Approved alternatives while hunting migratory waterfowl include pellets manufactured from steel, tungsten-iron, tungsten-polymer, tungsten-nickel-iron, and bismuth-tin in place of lead shot. In Canada, the United States, the United Kingdom, and many western European countries (France as of 2006), all shot used for hunting migratory waterfowl must now be non-toxic, and therefore may not contain any lead.

Steel was one of the first widely used lead alternatives that the ammunition industry turned to. But steel is one hundred times harder than lead, with only two-thirds its density, resulting in undesirable ballistic properties compared to lead. Steel shot can be as hard as some barrels, and may therefore damage chokes on older firearms that were designed only for use with softer lead shot. The higher pressures required to compensate for the lower density of steel may exceed the design limits of a barrel.

Within recent years, several companies have created non-toxic shot out of bismuth, tungsten, or other elements or alloys with a density similar to or greater than lead, and with a shot softness that results in ballistic properties that are comparable to lead. These shells provide more consistent patterns and greater range than steel shot. They are also generally safe to use in older shotguns with barrels and chokes not rated for use with steel shot, such as for bismuth and tungsten-polymer (although not tungsten-iron) shot. Unfortunately, all non-lead shot other than steel is far more expensive than lead, which has diminished in its acceptance by hunters.

Non-toxic shot types approved by the US Fish and Wildlife Service
Approved shot type	Percent composition by weight
Bismuth-tin	97% bismuth, and 3% tin
Iron (steel)	Iron and carbon
Iron-tungsten	Any proportion of tungsten, and >1% iron
Iron-tungsten-nickel	>1% iron, any proportion of tungsten, and up to 40% nickel
Copper-clad iron	56.59-84% iron core, with copper cladding up to 44.1%
Corrosion-inhibited copper	≥99.9% copper with benzotriazole and thermoplastic fluorescent powder coatings
Tungsten-bronze	51.1% tungsten, 44.4% copper, 3.9% tin, and 0.6% iron, or 60% tungsten, 35.1% copper, 3.9% tin, and 1% iron
Tungsten-iron-copper-nickel	40–76% tungsten, 10–37% iron, 9–16% copper, and 5–7% nickel
Tungsten-matrix	95.9% tungsten, 4.1% polymer
Tungsten-polymer	95.5% tungsten, 4.5% Nylon 6 or Nylon 11
Tungsten-tin-iron	Any proportions of tungsten and tin, and >1% iron
Tungsten-tin-bismuth	Any proportions of tungsten, tin, and bismuth.
Tungsten-tin-iron-nickel	65% tungsten, 21.8% tin, 10.4% iron, and 2.8% nickel
Tungsten-iron-polymer	41.5–95.2% tungsten, 1.5–52.0% iron, and 3.5–8.0% fluoropolymer

== See also ==
- Slug (projectile)
- Bullet
- Pellet (air gun)
