= Varmint rifle =

Rifles used for hunting small game animals

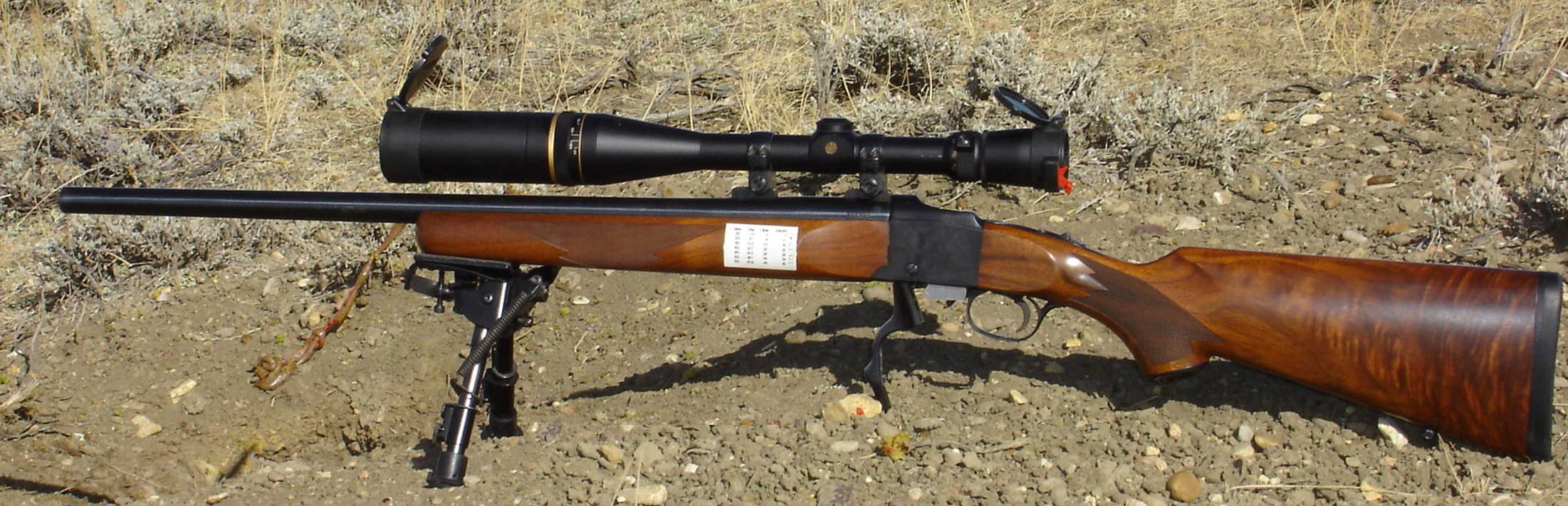
Ruger No. 1 Varmint rifle in .223 Remington. Note the heavy barrel, bipod rest, large telescopic sight, and "DOPE" sheet on the stock for windage

A varmint rifle or varminter is a type of small-caliber, precision-oriented long gun (firearm or high-powered airgun) primarily used for varmint hunting and pest control. Such rifles are typically characterized by sniper rifle-like designs such as heavy free-floating barrel, enhanced bedding, ergonomic gunstock, the use of bipod/beanbag and high-power telescopic sight, and the choice of high-muzzle velocity, high-ballistic coefficient munitions, which are all accurizing features needed for improving repeated shooting, often over long distances.

Both varmint hunting (which eliminates harassing outdoor nuisance animals collectively called varmints) and pest control (which removes infestations of destructive, often indoor pests) typically target animals that are difficult to eradicate by conventional hunting techniques due to their sheer numbers, burrowing or escape behaviors, camouflaging and defilading by the surroundings, or long alert distances that prevent easy approach or detection. These target animals typically come in three groups:

- Small/medium-sized non-game wild animals such as crows, ground squirrels, jackrabbits, nutria, marmots, groundhogs, porcupines, opossums, skunks and weasels, and small predators such as bobcats, coyotes and jackals, which can threaten crops, pastures, livestock and pets
- Non-native feral/invasive species such as starlings, cats, dogs, goats, wild boar/feral pigs and donkeys, which damage the native ecosystems
- Synanthropic animals considered to be annoying nuisances that may spread diseases, contaminate food storage and buildings, or be destructive to man-made properties and vegetation, such as rats, house mice and house sparrows

Varmint rifles fill a practical gap between the more powerful big game rifles and the less powerful rimfire firearms. Big-caliber hunting rifles are more suitable for taking down individual large animals such as reindeer, elk and buffalo at medium ranges, but not adequate for frequent repeated firing due to excessive waste heat and recoil. Rimfire (such as the highly popular .22 LR caliber) rifles, while great for shooting small vermin out in the open (such as squirrels and rats) at close distances, are somewhat underpowered for many outdoor rodents (which are often alert enough to spot hunters from beyond the effective ranges of rimfire rifles), small predators (such as coyotes) and larger feral animals such as goats and pigs; while indoor, rimfire rifles are often overpowered with unnecessary risks of collateral damages from overpenetration, ricochetting and stray shots. Varmint centerfire rifles are very suitable for repeated medium/long-range precision shots from a fixed firing position, and varmint air rifles are great for shooting indoor, thus fulfilling the functional demands of both types of varmint hunting applications.

== Common design elements ==
While any rifle of sufficient power can be used to dispatch targets of opportunity (the .30-30 Winchester lever action and the Ruger Mini-14 are common truck guns or ranch guns kept handy for this) the deliberate taking of varmints requires special characteristics more common to target rifles than "normal" hunting rifles.

== General characteristics ==
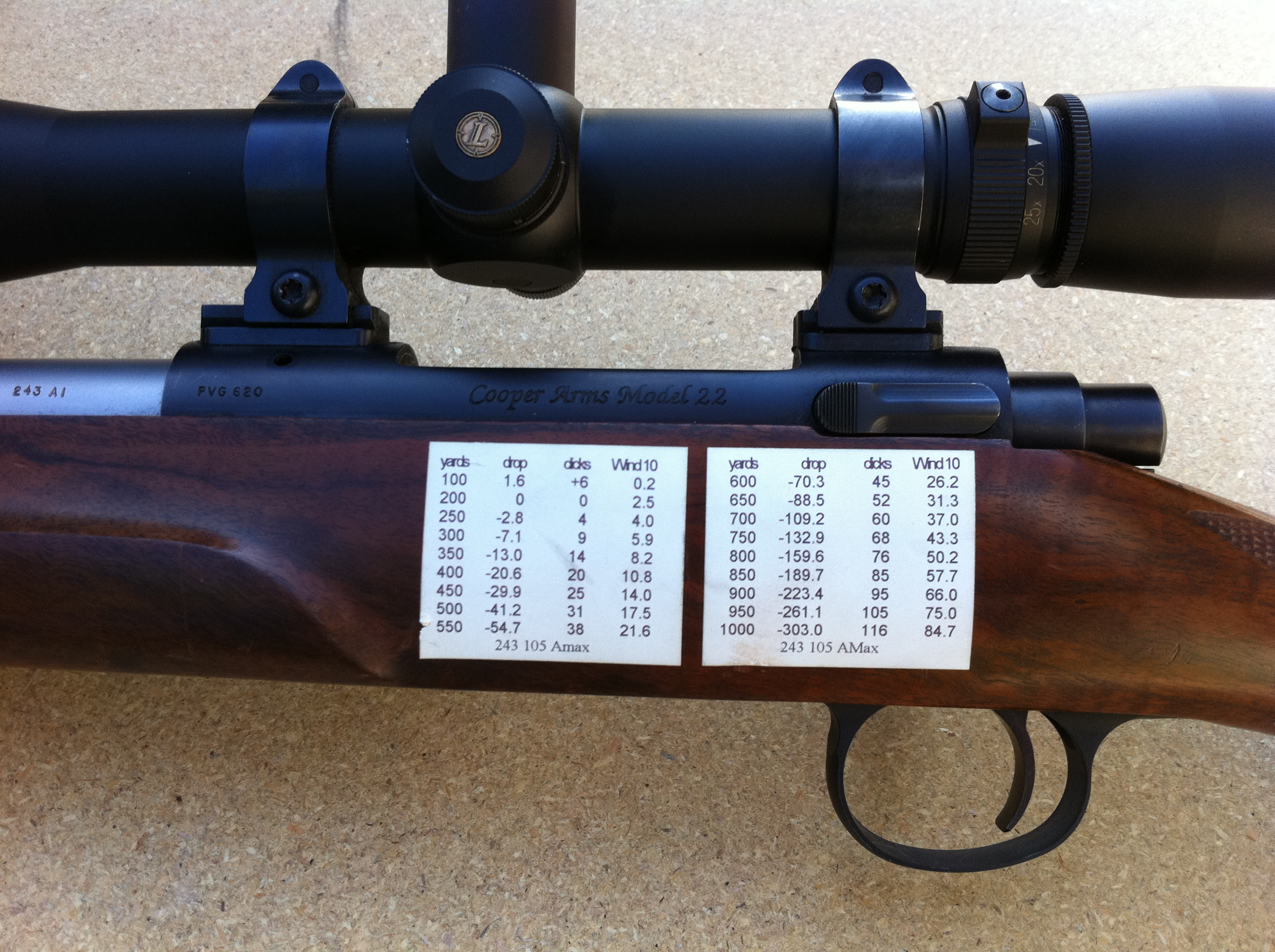
"DOPE sheets" for calculating bullet drop and wind drift are frequently used

Varmint rifles can typically be distinguished from other light-caliber hunting or plinking rifles in the use of heavier barrels and (often) omission of open sights. Use of magnifying optics allows for more accurate fire (often on very small, distant targets). Barrels will generally be free-floated, and other accurizing techniques will be performed, either by the manufacturer or the owner. The stocks will generally have wider forends, designed for use on stable sandbag rests, and high combs for easy use with optics.

Since part of the definition of a "varmint" is that it is a nuisance, varmints are not stalked, but rather they are hunted from a fixed position. This makes weight of little consideration in a varmint rifle, so heavy barrels are common. Varmints are also not subject to the same bag limits as game animals are, so far more shots may be fired. The heavier barrel is, in general, more accurate than a light barrel, plus the extra mass helps reduce the felt recoil and absorb the heat from more shots before expanding and potentially reducing accuracy. Folding shooting benches and sandbag rests help provide a stable base for the shooter, allowing the maximum accuracy to be extracted from the rifle. To reduce noise, flash, and hearing damage, silencers are sometimes employed on varmint rifles.

== Calibers ==
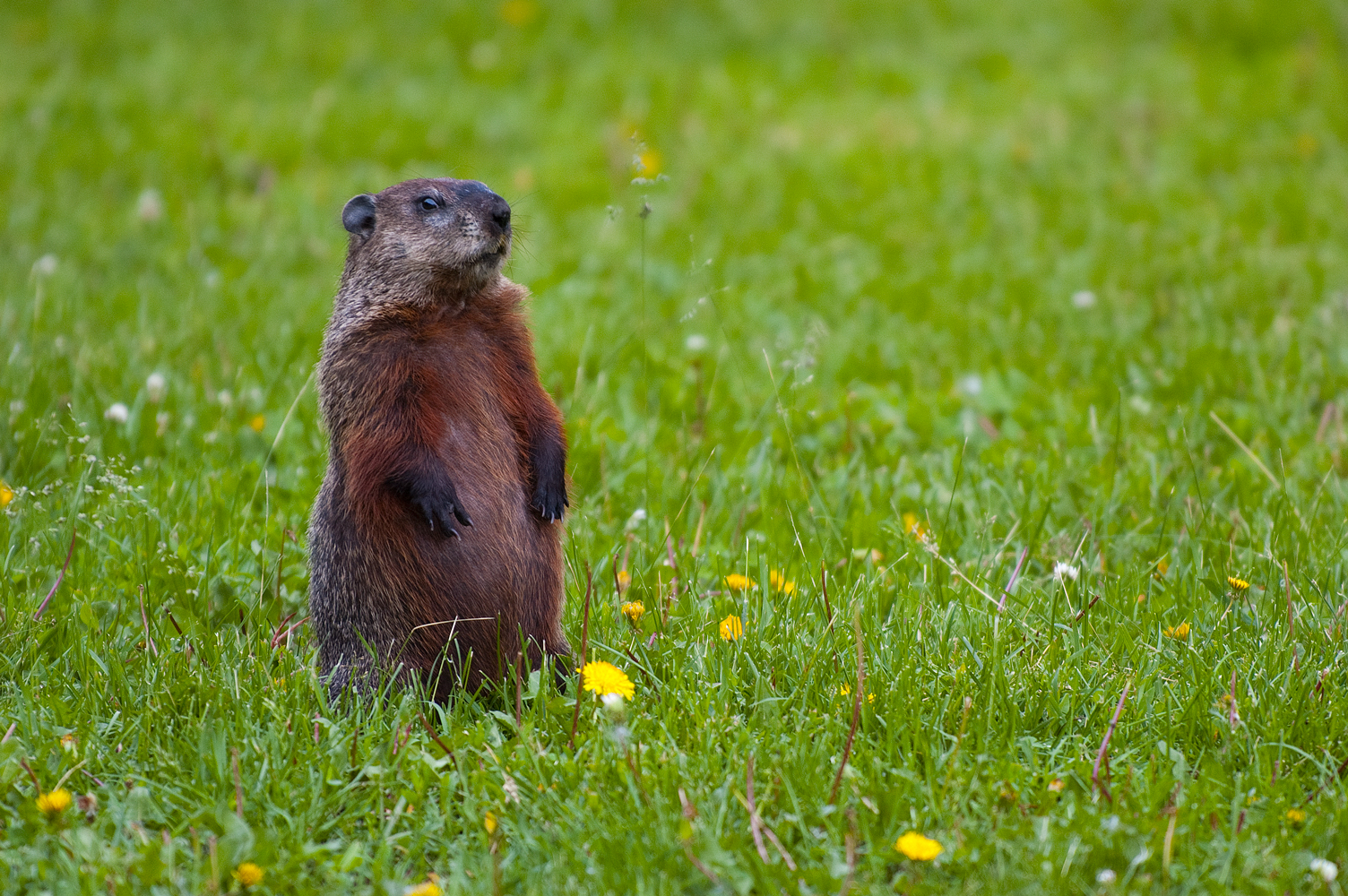
An alert rodent will usually hide underground before hunters can approach within 100 metres (110 yd).

Since varmints are generally smaller animals, large, heavy bullets are not needed. A light, fast bullet gives a flat trajectory, making range estimation less vital for accurate shot placement. Velocities for modern varmint rounds are usually in excess of 3,000 ft/s (910 m/s) such as the .223 Remington and some like the .220 Swift can exceed 4,000 ft/s (1,200 m/s). This allows long range shots with a short time of flight, and little change in trajectory at different ranges (see external ballistics). A bullet drop of only a couple of inches (about 5 cm (2.0 in)) is enough to cause a miss on smaller varmint animals; so flat trajectories increase hit probability at long ranges. Fast, lightly constructed bullets have the additional advantage of rapidly disintegrating upon initial contact. Disintegration minimizes the range of ricochet particles; and energy release of disintegration kills small animals more quickly than a penetrating wound.

Rifles firing .22 caliber bullets became popular varmint guns after World War I. Calibers up to .264 caliber (6.5 mm), including .243 Winchester, 6mm Remington and .25-06 Remington, became popular for ranges over 200 metres (220 yards) as the ballistic advantages of heavier bullets were recognized. Varmint shooting is one of the few areas where calibers smaller than .22 (5.56 mm) are found; the .17 Remington and various other .17 caliber (4.5 mm) wildcats have a vocal following, and the new .204 Ruger is well suited to varminting, and may be the first in a new line of .20 caliber (5mm) rounds.

For shorter ranges (less than about 100 yards (91 meters)) rimfire cartridges such as .22 Magnum and .17 Hornady Magnum Rimfire are popular. The .22 Long Rifle will also do, but the low muzzle velocities result in a supersonic to subsonic transition on the way to the target, which can negatively affect accuracy.

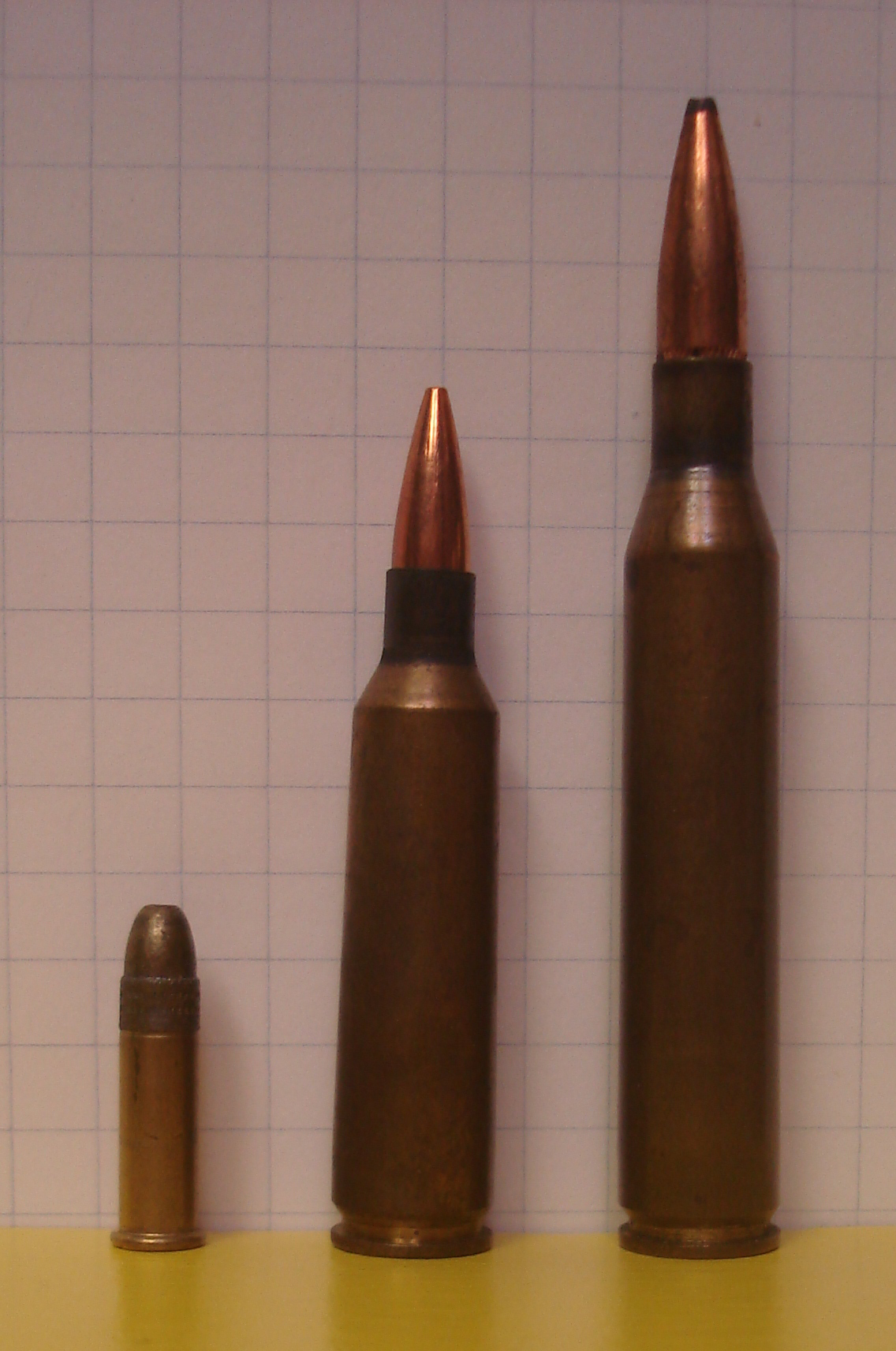
Typical varmint rifle cartridges on a 0.25-inch (6 mm) grid (from left to right): .22 long rifle for very small animals at ranges less than 100 meters, .22-250 represents the high velocity .22 calibers for longer range shooting, and .25-06 for larger animals at ranges up to 400 meters.

== History in the United States ==
While hunting was originally a means of obtaining meat for hunter-gatherers, it became a recreational outdoor activity as domestication of mammals and birds provided a more reliable source of meat. By the late 19th century, game laws were enacted to protect declining populations of hunted wildlife. These laws typically restricted the period during which hunting was allowed, and the number of animals which could be killed. Recreational hunters seeking alternative targets focused on animals exempted from protection because they were perceived as destructive to agricultural activities. These unprotected animals were often smaller than game species, and lived closer to human activities. Varmint hunting under these conditions required smaller bullets with improved accuracy in comparison to big-game hunting.

While the sporting arms industry focused on rifles for big-game hunting, individuals like Franklin Ware Mann investigated improved accuracy. Gunsmiths like Adolph Otto Niedner and Harry Melville Pope fitted gun barrels chambered for .22 caliber wildcat cartridges to conventional rifle actions. The popularity of these rifles encouraged Winchester Repeating Arms Company to release the .22 Hornet in 1930 and the .220 Swift in 1935. As United States factories shifted production to military ammunition for World War II, demand for .22 varmint bullets encouraged formation of the Rock Chuck Bullet Swage Company. Soldiers returning from the war to use their firearms training for varmint hunting encouraged release of more .22 cartridges including Remington Arms' .222 Remington.

== .22 centerfire cartridges ==
- .22 Savage Hi-Power was introduced by Savage Arms in 1912 by necking down the .25-35 Winchester case to fire a .228-inch-diameter (5.8 mm) bullet. The .22 Marcianti Blue Streak was a wildcat modification; but the following cartridges fired more popular .224-inch-diameter (5.7 mm) bullets.
- .22 Hornet became the first commercially successful varmint cartridge in the Winchester Model 54 of 1930.
- .22 Lindahl Chuckers were ballistically similar wildcats developed by Leslie Lindahl from the rimmed .219 Zipper and the rimless .25 Remington.
- .218 Bee is a necked-down .25-20 Winchester introduced in the Winchester Repeating Arms Model 65 of 1938. This lever-action rifle was not well received by varmint hunters, and the cartridge has remained relatively unpopular.
- .219 Zipper is a necked-down .25-35 Winchester introduced in the Winchester Model 64 of 1937. This lever-action rifle was not well received by varmint hunters, but the cartridge and wildcat modifications (like the .219 Donaldson Wasp) became popular in other actions.
- .220 Swift was introduced in the Winchester Model 54 in 1935 as the first commercial cartridge with bullet velocity exceeding 4,000 feet (1,200 meters) per second. The .220 Arrow is a wildcat modification of the .220 Swift.
- .221 Remington Fireball is a shortened version of the .222 Remington introduced in the Remington XP-100 bolt-action handgun (sometimes called a hand rifle) in 1962. The cartridge has attained some popularity in conventional rifles where low noise level is a consideration.
- .222 Remington was a new cartridge (resembling a 3/4 scale version of the .30-06 Springfield) introduced commercially in 1950. It was the first new case development since 1935 and has been popular with varmint and benchrest shooters.
- .222 Remington Magnum was a lengthened version of the .222 Remington introduced in 1958, but it never achieved the popularity of the .222 Remington. Although the longer cartridge with slightly larger power capacity offers advantages over the very similar .223 Remington, subsequent availability of surplus 5.56×45mm NATO brass and ammunition has reduced commercial availability of rifles chambered for the .222 Remington Magnum.
- .223 Remington became available in 1964 as the civilian version of the 5.56×45mm NATO, and has become one of the most popular cartridges in use today. It is currently used in a wide range of semi-automatic and manual action rifles and even handguns; such as the Colt AR-15, Ruger Mini-14, Remington Model 700, and Remington XP-100. Popularity of the .223 Remington virtually eliminated production of rifles chambered for the similar .222 Remington and .222 Remington Magnum. Rifles with 1-in-7 inch rifling twist to stabilize military green bullets may be unsuitable for light varmint bullets unable to withstand the faster rotation at velocities above 2,800 ft (850 m) per second.
- .224 Weatherby Magnum was introduced in 1963 as a replacement for Weatherby's .220 Swift wildcat .220 Weatherby Rocket. Only Weatherby rifles have been commercially chambered for this cartridge.
- .225 Winchester was a commercial modification of the .219 Zipper offered in the Winchester Model 70 from 1964 to 1971. The cartridge was unsuccessful in replacing the ballistically similar .220 Swift in the Winchester product line.
- .22-250 was a wildcat developed in 1937 by J.E. Gebby from the .250-3000 Savage and commercially loaded by Remington Arms in 1964.
- .22/3000 Lovell was a wildcat developed by Hervey Lovell from the old .25-20 single shot case (different from .25-20 Winchester). Popularity of Lovell's cartridges declined when manufacture of .25-20 single-shot cartridges ceased.
- .22-4000 Schnerring-Sedgley was a wildcat developed by Frankford Arsenal Proof House Foreman George Schnerring by necking down a 7mm Mauser.
- .303/22 was a wildcat developed from the .303 British in Canada and Australia during the 1930s.

== Action types ==
Bolt-action rifles dominate the class, with a few specialized single-shot rifles making up the rest. Most bolt-action rifles, if accurized, can be successfully used for varmint hunting. While nearly all varmint guns are rifles, there are a few pistols, generally single shot and bolt-action pistols in rifle calibers such as those developed for metallic silhouette shooting, that have sufficient accuracy, range, and trajectory to allow them to be used for varmint shooting. The Remington XP-100 bolt-action pistol and its aptly named .221 Fireball cartridge, introduced in 1963, were developed for varmint hunting; the full name is the "Model XP-100 Varmint Special".

For varmint and pest control in urban areas, air guns make suitable choices. While the limited power of an air rifle (generally far less than a .22 Long Rifle) limits its usefulness to small rodents at very short range, the limited penetration and low noise allows them to be used in areas where use of firearms is impractical. The popular air gun sport of field target is based on small game and varmint shooting, with targets often shaped like rabbits, squirrels, and other suitable small varmints. The low velocities of air gun pellets makes accurate range estimation paramount, so high magnification telescopic sights are used, with calibrated focus knobs that serve to estimate the range.

== See also ==
- Poacher's gun – Easily concealable firearm
