= Caliber =

Internal diameter of the barrel of a gun

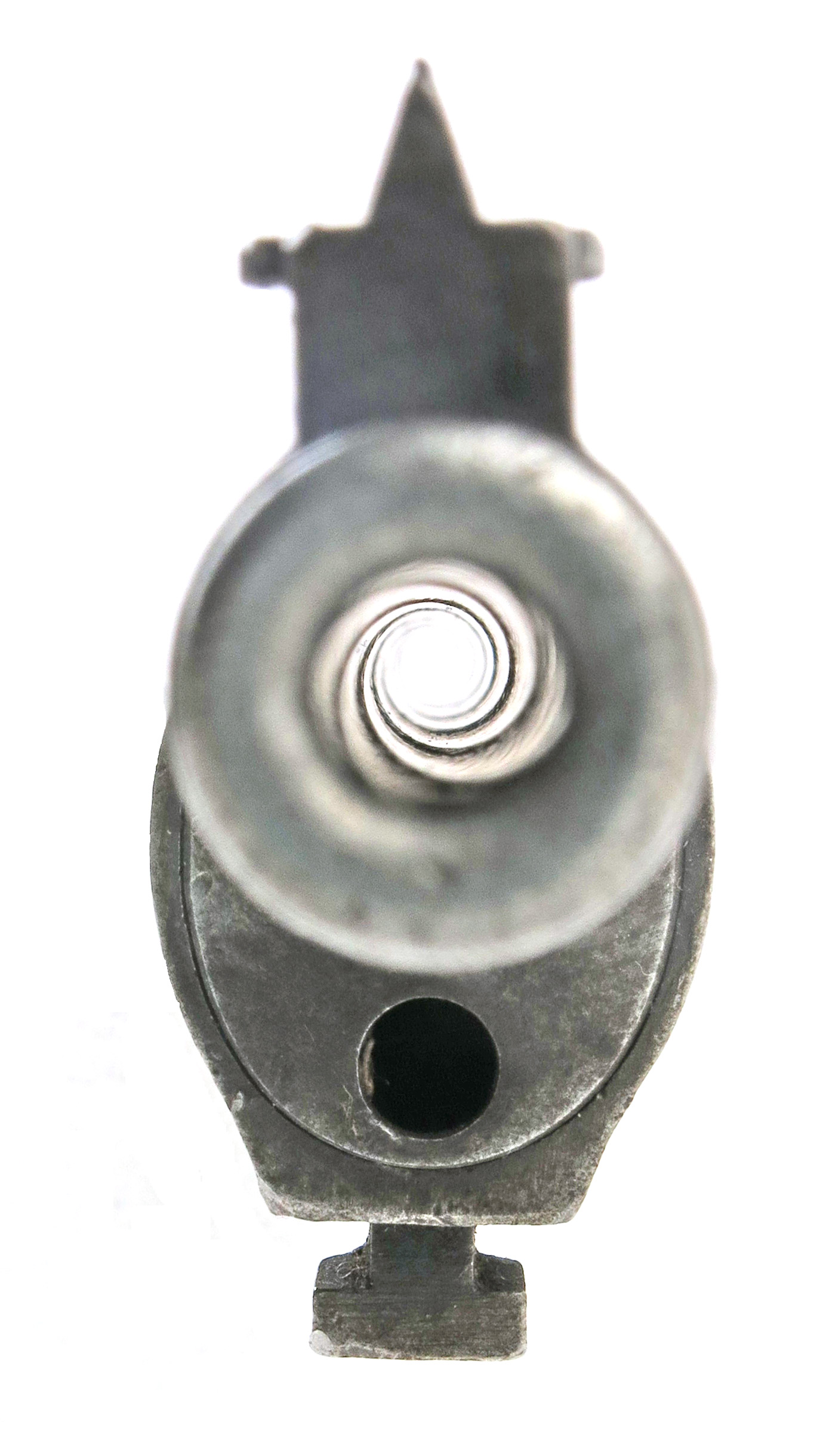
7.92 mm caliber rifle barrel (Mauser m/96)

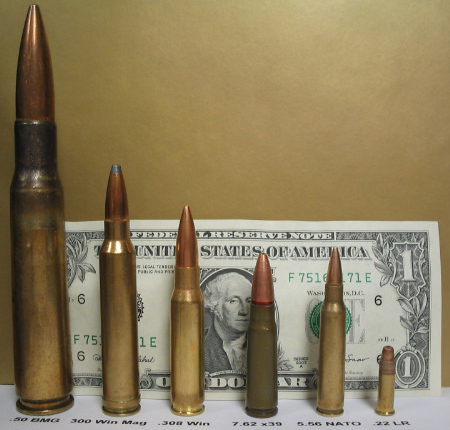
Rifle cartridges: from left: 50 BMG • 300 Win Mag • 308 Winchester • 7.62 × 39 mm • 5.56 × 45 mm NATO • 22 LR

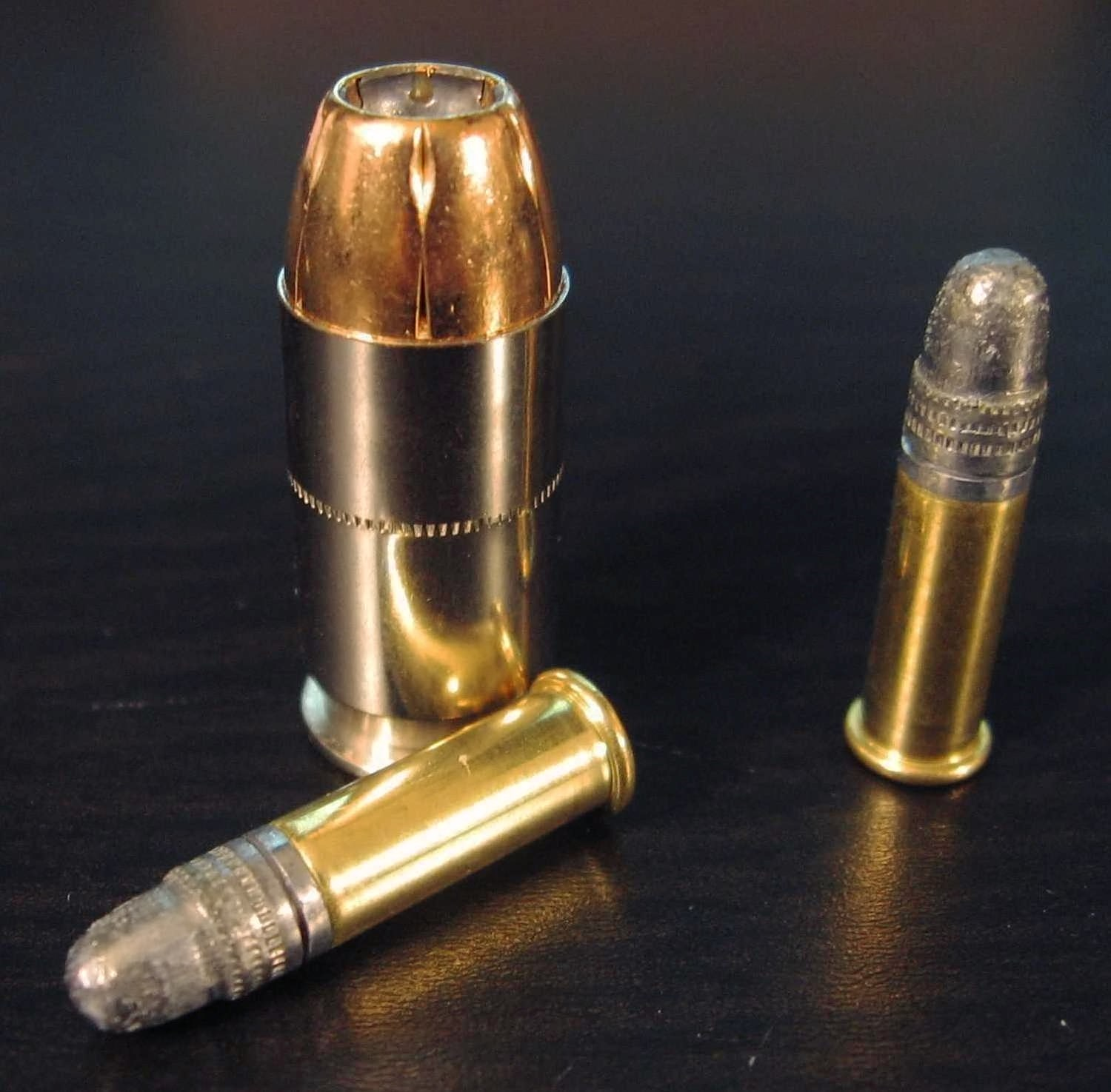
A 45 ACP hollowpoint (Federal HST) with two 22 LR cartridges for comparison

In guns, particularly firearms, but not artillery, where a different definition may apply, caliber (or calibre; sometimes abbreviated as "cal") is the specified nominal internal diameter of the gun barrel bore – regardless of how or where the bore is measured and whether the finished bore matches that specification. It is measured in inches or in millimeters. Since metric and US customary units do not convert evenly at this scale, metric conversions of caliber measured in decimal inches are typically approximations of the precise specifications in non-metric units, and vice versa.

In a rifled barrel, the distance is measured between opposing lands (minor diameter) or between opposing grooves (major diameter); groove measurements are common in cartridge designations originating in the United States, while land measurements are more common elsewhere in the world. Measurements "across the grooves" are used for maximum precision because rifling and the specific caliber so measured is the result of final machining process which cuts grooves into the rough bore, leaving the "lands" behind.

Good performance requires a concentric, straight bore that accurately centers the projectile within the barrel, in preference to a "tight" fit which can be achieved even with off-center, crooked bores that cause excessive friction, fouling and an out-of-balance, wobbling projectile in flight.

Calibers fall into four general categories by size:

- miniature-bore historically refers to calibers with a diameter of 0.22 inches (5.6 mm) or smaller
- small-bore refers to calibers with a diameter of 0.32 inches (8.1 mm) or smaller
- medium-bore refers to calibers with a diameter of 0.33 inches (8.4 mm) to 0.39 inches (9.9 mm)
- large-bore refers to calibers with a diameter of 0.40 inches (10 mm) or larger

There is much variance in the use of the term "small-bore", which over the years has changed considerably, with anything under 0.577 inches (14.7 mm) considered "small-bore" prior to the mid-19th century.

== Cartridge naming conventions ==
While modern firearms are generally referred to by the name of the cartridge the gun is chambered for, they are still categorized together based on bore diameter. For example, a firearm might be described as a "30 caliber rifle", which could accommodate any of a wide range of cartridges using a roughly 0.30 inches (7.6 mm) projectile; or as a "22 rimfire", referring to any rimfire firearms firing cartridges with a 22 caliber projectile. However, there can be significant differences in nominal bullet and bore dimensions, and all cartridges so "categorized" are not automatically identical in actual caliber.

For example, 303 British firearms and projectiles are often "categorized" as ".30-caliber" alongside several dozen U.S. "30-caliber" cartridges despite using bullets of .310–.312-inch (7.87–7.92 mm) diameter while all U.S. "30-caliber" centerfire rifle cartridges use a common, standard .308-inch (7.82 mm) bullet outside diameter. Using bullets larger than design specifications causes excessive pressures, while undersize bullets cause low pressures, insufficient muzzle velocities and fouling that will eventually lead to excessive pressures.

Makers of early cartridge arms had to invent methods of naming cartridges since no established convention existed then. One of the early established cartridge arms was the Spencer repeating rifle, which Union forces used in the American Civil War. It was named based on the chamber dimensions, rather than the bore diameter, with the earliest cartridge called the "No. 56 cartridge", indicating a chamber diameter of .56 in; the bore diameter varied considerably, from .52 to .54 in. Later various derivatives were created using the same basic cartridge, but with smaller-diameter bullets; these were named by the cartridge diameter at the base and mouth. The original No. 56 became the .56-56, and the smaller versions, .56-52, .56-50, and .56-46. The 56–52, the most common of the new calibers, used a 50-cal bullet.

Other black powder-era cartridges used naming schemes that appeared similar, but measured entirely different characteristics; 45-70, 44-40, and 32-20 were designated by bullet diameter to hundredths of an inch and standard black powder charge in grains. Optionally, the bullet weight in grains was designated, such as 45-70-405. This scheme was far more popular and was carried over after the advent of early smokeless powder cartridges such as the 30-30 Winchester and 22 Long. Later developments used terms to indicate relative power, such as .44 Special and .44 Magnum. Variations on these methods persist today, with new cartridges such as the 204 Ruger and 17 HMR (Hornady Magnum Rimfire).

Metric diameters for small arms refer to cartridge dimensions and are expressed with an "×" between the bore diameter and the length of the cartridge case; for example, the 6.5×55mm Swedish cartridge has a bore diameter of 6.5 mm and a case length of 55 mm.

The means of measuring a rifled bore varies, and may refer to the diameter of the lands or the grooves of the rifling. For example, the 257 Roberts and 250 Savage both use a .257 inch projectile; both 250 Savage and 257 Roberts rifle bores have a .250 inch land diameter and .257 inch groove diameter. The .308 Winchester is measured across the grooves and uses a .308-in diameter (7.82-mm) bullet; the military-specification version is known as 7.62 × 51 mm NATO, so called because the bore diameter measured between the lands is 7.62 mm, and the cartridge has a case 51 mm long.

== Rifle caliber and cartridge conversions ==
Converting a rifle to fire a different cartridge in the same bore diameter, often involves merely re-chambering the barrel to the new cartridge dimensions, if the rim diameter of the new cartridge matches that of the old cartridge. Converting a rifle to fire a different cartridge in a different caliber and bore as what it initially was, means that the barrel of the rifle will also need to be changed. Because many competitive precision rifle shooters often shoot thousands of rounds per year both for practice and competitions, and they more often reach the end of their barrel life, whereby the rifling is worn down to a point where a rifle loses some of its accuracy, the choice to make a caliber or cartridge change is often done at the same time as when a new rifle barrel is fitted to the rifle by a gunsmith. There are a few important factors to consider when converting a rifle to a different caliber or cartridge. The action of the rifle should be long enough to contain the new cartridge, the magazine should also be able to hold the new cartridge, the bolt face should be the correct diameter and the extractor the correct size to hold the head of the new cartridge. The most common of these caliber conversions on rifles, are usually done to change from a parent cartridge to a new cartridge based on it, like when converting a rifle to a 6.5 mm Creedmoor from a 308 Winchester on which it is based.

== Metric and US customary ==
The following table lists some of the commonly used calibers where both metric and US customary units are used as equivalents. Due to variations in naming conventions, and the whims of the cartridge manufacturers, bullet diameters can vary widely from the diameter implied by the name. For example, a difference of 0.045 in (1.15 mm) occurs between the smallest and largest of the several cartridges designated as ".38 caliber".

Common calibers in inch and their metric equivalents
Caliber	Metric caliber	Typical bullet diameter	Common cartridges	Notes
0.172	4 mm	0.172 in	17 HMR, 17 Hornet, 17 Ackley Hornet, 17 Winchester Super Magnum, 17-32 Magnum, 17 VHA, 17 Remington, 17/222, 17 Mach III-IV, 17 Ackley Improved Bee, 17-357 RG, 17 Remington Fireball, 17 Incinerator, 4.39×39R mm SPS	
0.204	5 mm	0.204 in	204 Ruger, 5mm Remington Rimfire Magnum	
0.221	5.45 mm	0.221 in	5.45×39mm Russian family	Russian Mil Std
0.223	5.56 mm	0.224 in	22 Long Rifle, .223 Remington, 5.56 NATO , 297/230 Morris Extra Long, 22 Hornet, 22 Rem Automatic, 5.66 x39 MPS, 22 Rem Jet	
0.224	5.7 mm	0.224 in	218 Bee, 219 Zipper, 22 Hornet-K, 220 Swift, 222 Remington, 222 Remington Magnum, 223 Remington, 5.56×45 mm NATO, 5.7×28 mm, .22 TCM, 5.8 × 42 Chinese, 224 Weatherby Magnum, 225 Winchester, 223 Winchester Super Short Magnum (Obsolete) 223 Ackley Improved, 219 Donaldson Wasp, 221 Remington Fireball, 22-250 Remington, and more	
0.243	6 mm	0.243 in	243 Winchester, 244 Remington, 6 mm Remington, 6 mm Whisper, 6 mm PPC, 6 mm Bench Rest Remington, 6 × 45 mm, 6 × 47 mm, 6 mm Cheetah, 240 Weatherby, 6 × 62 Freres, 6 mm Norma BR, 6mm XC Tubb, 6 mm JDJ, 6 mm SAW, 6-250 Walker, 6.17 Spitfire, 6.17 Flash, 6 mm Lee Navy, and more	
0.25	6.35 mm	0.257 in, 6.35 mm	25 ACP (0.251"), 250/3000 Savage, 257 Roberts, 25-06 (0.257"),	also called .25 Auto and 6.35mm Browning
0.26	6.5 mm	0.264 in, 6.7 mm	6.5 × 55 mm Swedish, 260 Remington, 26 Nosler, 6.5 mm Creedmoor, 6.5×47 mm Lapua, 6.5 mm Grendel	cartridges commonly known as "6.5 mm"
0.27	6.8 mm	0.277 in, 7.035 mm	270 Winchester, 6.8 SPC, .277 Fury	
0.284	7 mm	0.284 in, 7.213 mm	280 Remington, 7 mm-08 Remington, 7 mm Weatherby Magnum, 7 mm Remington Magnum, 7 × 57 mm Mauser, 7 × 64 mm	commonly called "7 mm"
0.308	7.62 mm	0.308 in, 7.82 mm	30 Luger (7.65×21mm Luger), .30-30 Winchester, 30 Herrett, 300 Whisper, 30-378 Weatherby, 7.63 Mannlicher–Schoenauer, 7.63 Mauser, 30 USA Rimless, 308 Corbon, .3-9 Savage, 30 Kurz, 300 BLK (7.62 × 35 mm), 7.5mm Schmidt–Rubin, 300 Winchester Magnum, 30 Carbine, 309 JDJ, .30-03 Springfield, .30-06 Springfield, .30-06 JDJ, .307 GNR, 308 Winchester (7.62 × 51 mm NATO), 300 Weatherby Magnum, 30 Army (30-40 Krag), 7.82 mm Lazzeroni, and more	
0.307	7.8 mm	0.307 in, 7.8 mm	7.5 FK (aka 7.5 × 27mm)	
0.311	7.9 mm	0.311 in, 7.92 mm	303 British, 7.62 × 39 mm Soviet, 7.62 × 54 mmR, 7.62 × 25 mm, 7.7 × 58 mm	7.62×54mmR is actually 7.92 mm (Mosin, SVD, PKM, etc.) The same applies to 7.62×39mm (AK-47, AKM, etc.)
0.312	7.94 mm	0.312 in, 7.94 mm	32 ACP, 32-20 Winchester	Also known as 7.65×17mm Browning
0.323	8 mm	0.323 in, 8.20 mm	8×57 mm Mauser, 325 WSM, 8 mm Remington Magnum, 8 mm plastic (airsoft) BBs	.32 caliber rifle cartridges
0.327	8 mm	0.327 in, 8.30 mm	8 mm Lebel	8x51 mm R (ex 8x50 mm R)
0.338	8.6 mm	0.338 in	338 Lapua Magnum, 338 Norma Magnum, 338 Winchester Magnum, 338-378 Weatherby Magnum	C14 Timberwolf (Canadian Forces)
0.355	9 mm	0.355 in, 9.01 mm	9 mm Luger (aka 9×19 mm Parabellum, aka 9 mm NATO), 9 mm Ultra, 9 mm Bayard Long, 9 mm Mauser, 9 mm Winchester Magnum, 9 mm Glisenti, 9 × 21 mm, 9 × 23 mm Winchester, 9 mm Mi-Bullet, 9 mm Steyr, .356 Team Smith & Wesson, 9 mm Federal, 9 mm × 25 mm Dillon, 9mm Action Express, 357 SIG, .380 ACP (9mm Short)	
0.356	9 mm	0.356 in	9×56mm Mannlicher–Schoenauer, 9 mm × 57mm Mauser	
0.357	9 mm	0.357 in, 9.1 mm	38 Super, 38 Special, .38 S&W, 357 Magnum, 35 Remington, 9 mm Browning Long	Handgun cartridges known as "38" are .357 caliber. Generally .357 for revolvers and rifles, .355 in autoloaders
0.363	9 mm	0.365 in, 9.27 mm	9 × 18 mm Makarov	
0.365	9.3 mm	0.365 in	9 × 39 mm, 9.3 × 62 mm, 9.3 × 64 mm Brenneke, 9.3 × 72 mmR, 9.3 × 74 mmR	
0.375	9.5 mm	0.375 in, 9.53 mm	375 H&H Magnum, 9.5 × 57 mm Mannlicher–Schönauer (375 Rimless Nitro Express (RNE) × 2¼)	
0.40	10 mm	0.400 in	40 S&W, 10 mm Auto	
0.410	10.4 mm	0.410 in	410 bore	
0.44	10.9 mm	0.429 in	444 Marlin, 44 S&W Russian, 44 S&W Special, 44 Remington Magnum, 44 Auto Mag, 440 Cor-Bon, 44/454 JDJ Woodswalker	
0.45	11.43 mm	0.451–0.454 in	45 ACP, 45 GAP, 454 Casull, 45 Long Colt, 455 Webley, 45 Schofield, 460 S&W Magnum	Bullet diameter depends on bullet type/material. Generally 0.451 in for full metal jacket bullets and 0.454 in for lead bullets.
0.50	12.7 mm	0.510 in, 12.95 mm	50 BMG, 50 Action Express, 12.7×108mm, 500 S&W Magnum, 50 Beowulf, 12.7x55mm	M2 Browning machine gun and other heavy machine guns, long-range rifles typified by Barrett products. Desert Eagle handgun.

== Shotguns ==
Shotguns are classed according to gauge, a related expression. The gauge of a shotgun refers to how many lead spheres, each with a diameter equal to that of the bore, that amounts to one pound (454 g (1.0 lb)) in weight. In the case of a 12-gauge (18.5 mm) shotgun, it would take 12 spheres the size of the shotgun's bore to equal a pound. A numerically larger gauge indicates a smaller barrel: a 20-gauge (15.6 mm) shotgun requires more spheres to equal a pound; therefore, its barrel is smaller than the 12-gauge. This metric is used in Russia as "caliber number": e.g., "shotgun of the 12 caliber." The 16th caliber is known as "lordly" (Russian: барский). While shotgun bores can be expressed in calibers (the .410 bore shotgun is measured as .410 in (10.4 mm) in diameter, unlike with rifles the actual bore diameter of a smoothbore shotgun varies significantly down the length of the barrel, with the use of chokes and back-boring.

In the United Kingdom, "gauge" is referred to as "bore" and in the United States "bore" is referred to as "gauge", e.g. a "12-bore shotgun or 12-gauge shotgun" has a bore or gauge that can accommodate a lead sphere weighing 1/12th of a pound.

== As a measurement of length ==
The term caliber is used as a measure of length of artillery barrels from muzzle to breech, expressed as a multiple of the bore diameter. For example, a 4-inch gun of 50 calibers would have a barrel 4 in × 50 = 200 in long (written as 4" L/50 or 4"/50). A 16-inch gun of 50 calibers (16" L/50) has a barrel length of 50 × 16 = 800 inches (66 ft 8 in).

Both 14-in and 16-in navy guns were common in World War II. The British Royal Navy insisted on 50-cal guns on ships as it would allow 1,900 to 2,700 lb (860 to 1,220 kg) shells to travel at an initial velocity of up to 1,800 mph (2,897 km/h) to a distance of 26 mi (42 km).

== Pounds as a measure of cannon bore ==
Smoothbore cannon and carronade bores are designated by the weight in imperial pounds of spherical solid iron shot of diameter to fit the bore. Standard sizes are 6, 12, 18, 24, 32, and 42 pounds, with some non-standard weights using the same scheme. See Carronade#Ordnance.

From about the mid-17th until the mid-19th century, the measurement of the bore of large gunpowder weapons was usually expressed as the weight of its iron shot in pounds. Iron shot was used as the standard reference because iron was the most common material used for artillery ammunition during that period, and solid spherical shot the most common form encountered. Artillery was classified thereby into standard categories, with the 3-pounder, 4-pounder, 6-pounder, 8-pounder, 9-pounder, 12-pounder, 18-pounder, 24-pounder, and 32-pounder being the most common sizes encountered, although larger, smaller and intermediate sizes existed.

In practice, though, significant variation occurred in the actual mass of the projectile for a given nominal shot weight. The country of manufacture is a significant consideration when determining bore diameters. For example, the French livre, until 1812, had a mass of 489.5 g (1.079 lb), whilst the contemporary English (avoirdupois) pound massed of approximately 454 g (1.001 lb). Thus, a French 32-pounder at the Battle of Trafalgar threw a shot with 1.138 kg (2.51 lb) more mass than an English 32-pounder.

Complicating matters further, muzzle-loaded weapons require a significant gap between the sides of the tube bore and the surface of the shot. This is necessary so the projectile may be inserted from the mouth to the base of the tube and seated securely adjacent the propellant charge with relative ease. The gap, called windage, increases the size of the bore with respect to the diameter of the shot somewhere between 10% and 20% depending upon the year the tube was cast and the foundry responsible.

English gun classes c. 1800
gun class (pdr.)	projectile mass (kg)	shot diameter (cm)	shot volume (cm^{3})	approx. service bore (cm)
2	0.9 kg (2.0 lb)	6 cm (2.4 in)	115 cm^{3} (7.0 cu in)	6.6 cm (2.6 in)
3	1.4 kg (3.1 lb)	6.9 cm (2.7 in)	172 cm^{3} (10.5 cu in)	7.6 cm (3.0 in)
4	1.8 kg (4.0 lb)	7.6 cm (3.0 in)	230 cm^{3} (14 cu in)	8.4 cm (3.3 in)
6	2.7 kg (6.0 lb)	8.7 cm (3.4 in)	345 cm^{3} (21.1 cu in)	9.6 cm (3.8 in)
9	4.1 kg (9.0 lb)	10 cm (3.9 in)	518 cm^{3} (31.6 cu in)	11 cm (4.3 in)
12	5.4 kg (12 lb)	10.9 cm (4.3 in)	691 cm^{3} (42.2 cu in)	12.1 cm (4.8 in)
18	8.2 kg (18 lb)	12.6 cm (5.0 in)	1,037 cm^{3} (63.3 cu in)	13.8 cm (5.4 in)
24	10.9 kg (24 lb)	13.8 cm (5.4 in)	1,383 cm^{3} (84.4 cu in)	15.2 cm (6.0 in)
32	14.5 kg (32 lb)	15.2 cm (6.0 in)	1,844 cm^{3} (112.5 cu in)	16.7 cm (6.6 in)
64	29 kg (64 lb)	19.2 cm (7.6 in)	3,687 cm^{3} (225.0 cu in)	21.1 cm (8.3 in)

The relationship between bore diameter and projectile weight was severed following the widespread adoption of rifled weapons during the latter part of the 19th century. Guns continued to be classed by projectile weight into the mid-20th century, particularly in British service with guns, such as the 2-pounder, 6-pounder, and 17-pounder anti-tank weapons. However, this value no longer definitively related to bore diameter, since projectiles were no longer simple spheres—and in any case were more often hollow shells filled with explosives rather than solid iron shot.

== See also ==
- List of cartridges by caliber
- List of handgun cartridges
- List of rifle cartridges
- List of the largest cannon by caliber
- Table of handgun and rifle cartridges
