= Ned H. Roberts =

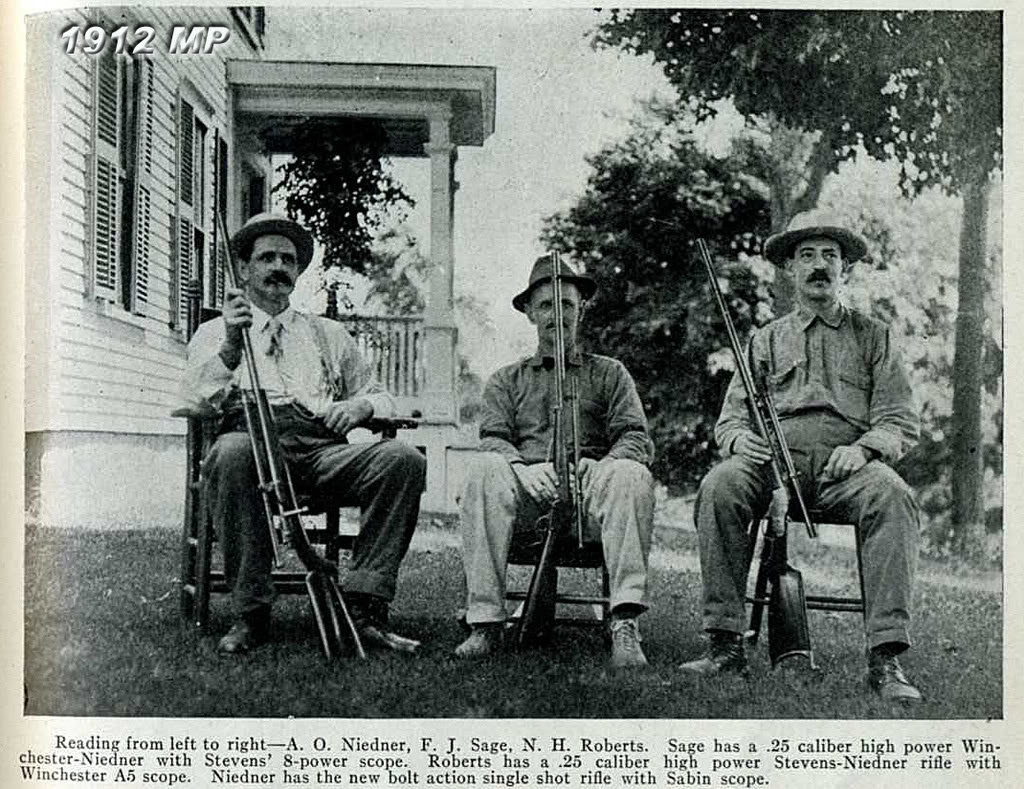
A.O. Neidner, F.W. Sage, and Ned H. Roberts with rifles, 1912

Major Ned H. Roberts (1866 Goffstown, N.H. -- 1948), was an American hunter, competition target shooter, gun writer & editor, ballistician and firearms experimenter. Roberts was a prolific contributor to sporting publications, including Outdoor Life, Outers, Arms and the Man (later renamed as American Rifleman, and to Hunting and Fishing magazine, for which latter publication he served as Firearms Editor. His work on cartridge design in collaboration with Adolph Otto Niedner, Franklin Weston Mann, Townsend Whelen, and F.J. Sage led to a commercialized version of his own original .25-caliber wildcat cartridge introduced by Remington in 1934 and named the .257 Roberts.

Development of the .257 Roberts

Roberts announced in the March 1928 issue of American Rifleman the creation of a new "ideal, or perfected" .25-caliber cartridge superior in ballistics and accuracy to any other cartridge yet produced in that caliber. Dr. F.W. Mann and Adolph Otto Niedner had previously developed wildcat cartridges in .25-caliber made by necking down the .30-40 Krag and the .30-06 Springfield cases. The two .30-caliber cases held too much powder, however, and could not be filled with any existing smokeless powder. Although good results had been obtained with the Krag cartridge case, a rimless cartridge compatible with the best (Springfield and Mauser) actions was desired.

He originally intended to base the new cartridge on the .30-06 case, as proposed by Townsend Whelen, but Whelen's friend and correspondent Harvey A. Donaldson pointed out, in a letter to Whelen that it would save work to modify the shorter 7x57 Mauser case. Roberts was a perfectionist and there followed years of trial-and-error testing which involved the making up of literally dozens of barrels for his .25-caliber wildcat, with different chambers, groove dimensions and rifling twists. Colonel Whelen once told Ken Waters that he doubted if any man ever spent so much time perfecting a cartridge as Ned Roberts did with his .25 Roberts, as he originally called it.

Colonel Townsend Whelen and Mr. L. C. Weldin, ballistic engineer of the Hercules Powder Company advised using a shoulder angle of 15° in order to hold down pressures with the rather fast-burning powders of the late 1920s. This suggestion was adopted and the 7mm case necked down, formed to the new long-sloping shoulder, and trimmed approximately 1/16". The Neidner Rifle Corporation of Dowagiac, Michigan proceeded to offer barrels and complete rifles in the new caliber featuring A.O. Neidner's usual close chambering. The result was availability to an elite audience of especially keen and affluent shooters of the original wildcat .25 Roberts cartridge, designed to be capable of firing 1-inch ten shot groups at 100 yards from a rest with a telescopic sight.

Griffin & Howe, the great New York custom gun-making firm, soon followed suit, making custom rifles chambered in their own slightly-modified version of the wildcat cartridge. The .25 Griffin & Howe differed from the .25 Roberts only with respect to the New York company, skipping one step and opting for a slightly longer cartridge by leaving the 7x57 Mauser case untrimmed.

In 1934, Remington decided to make the new .25 Roberts cartridge available commercially. Remington eliminated case-trimming and modified the shoulder angle from the original 15° to 20° for greater ease in manufacturing. The resulting cartridge had a 1/16" longer case, and was given the slightly different designation of .257 Roberts. The new Remington cartridge went on to become, for decades, one of the most popular North American hunting cartridges.

Schuetzen Rifle and Other Target Shooting

Roberts published extensively on match target, Schuetzen, and long-range hunting rifles of both the 19th century black powder era and the early 20th century smokeless powder era. After his death, a number of his articles and letters on these subjects were collected and published by Gerald O. Kelver in 1951.

== Published works ==
- The Muzzle-Loading Cap Lock Rifle. Manchester, N.H., The Granite State Press, 1940. [Riling 2333]
- Big Game Hunting; white-tailed deer and black bear. Chicago, Paul, Richmond & Co., 1947. [Riling 2614]
- Major Ned H. Roberts and the Schuetzen Rifle. edited by Gerald O. Kelver, 1951 ISBN 1-877704-22-9
