= Kidnapping of Debra Puglisi =

Kidnapping victim

On April 20, 1998, 40-year-old Donald A. Flagg kidnapped and subsequently raped 49-year-old Debra Puglisi and murdered 50-year-old Anthony "Nino" Puglisi Jr. in New Castle, Delaware. Flagg held Puglisi captive for 5 days before leaving her alone to go to work, she was able to phone police.

== Crime ==
On April 20, 1998, Donald Flagg, who was reportedly high on crack cocaine at the time, searched the neighborhood near the factory where he worked with the intention of kidnapping someone. Flagg broke into the Puglisi's residence, and after initially being startled by Anthony Puglisi entering the home, Flagg hit him, and shot and killed him at point blank range. After shooting Anthony, he waited in the kitchen for Debra to enter. He then kidnapped and raped Debra, whom he held captive for the next 5 days. When Flagg went to work on April 24, she was able loosen to the ropes he had tied around her, and phoned for police to rescue her. Flagg was charged with murder, rape, and weapons violations. He pled not guilty by reason of insanity, primarily stemming from a diagnosis of paranoid schizophrenia. The jury rejected his defense and convicted him of all charges including two counts of first degree murder.

In 2007, she was given a special courage award by the US government for her work in Delaware supporting rape victims. She later remarried to a man named Bill and took the name Debra Puglisi Sharp. In 2013, she wrote a book about surviving the kidnapping entitled “Shattered: Reclaiming a Life Torn Apart by Violence,” to help others who had been through something similar and said it was "cathartic to talk about it".
