= Point-blank range =

Distance at which a firearm or projectile can be fired directly at its target and hit

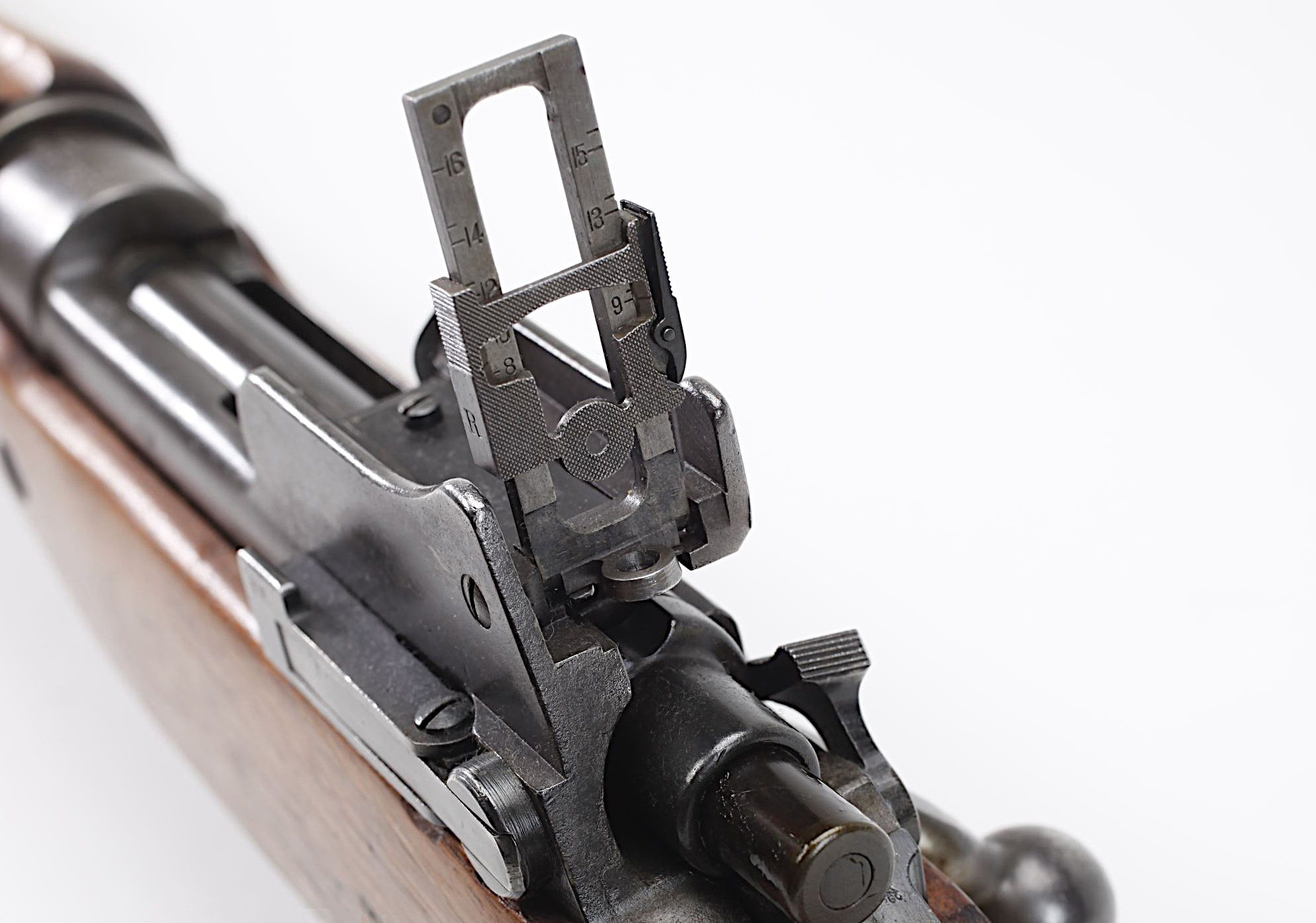
The ladder sight on an M1917 Enfield rifle. When the bar on the rear sight is raised, the barrel of the rifle points slightly upwards compared to the sights. This compensates for bullet drop over a given range.

Point-blank range is any distance over which a certain firearm or gun can hit a target without the need to elevate the barrel to compensate for bullet drop, i.e. the gun can be pointed horizontally at the target. For targets beyond-blank range, the shooter will have to point the barrel of their firearm at a position above the target, and firearms that are designed for long range firefights usually have adjustable sights to help the shooter hit targets beyond point-blank range. The maximum point-blank range of a firearm will depend on a variety of factors such as muzzle velocity and the size of the target.

In popular usage, point-blank range has come to mean extremely close range with a firearm, yet not close enough to be a contact shot. Point-blank (when describing a person) means direct or blunt.

== History ==
The term point-blank dates to the 1570s and is probably of French origin, deriving from pointé à blanc, "pointed at white". It is thought the word blanc may be used to describe a small white aiming spot formerly at the center of shooting targets. However, since none of the early sources mention a white center target, blanc may refer to empty space or zero point of elevation when testing range.

The term originated with the techniques used to aim muzzle-loading cannon. Their barrels tapered from breech to muzzle, so that when the top of the cannon was held horizontal, its bore actually sat at an elevated angle. This caused the projectile to rise above the natural line of sight shortly after leaving the muzzle, then drop below it after the apex of its slightly parabolic trajectory was reached.

By repeatedly firing a given projectile with the same charge, the point where the shot fell below the bottom of the bore could be measured. This distance was considered the point-blank range: any target within it required the gun to be depressed; any beyond it required elevation, up to the angle of greatest range at somewhat before 45 degrees.

Various cannon of the 19th century had point-blank ranges from 250 yards (230 m) (12 lb howitzer, 0.595 lb (0.270 kg) powder charge) to nearly 1,075 yards (983 m) (30 lb carronade, solid shot, 3.53 lb (1.60 kg) powder charge).

== Small arms ==
=== Maximum point-blank range ===
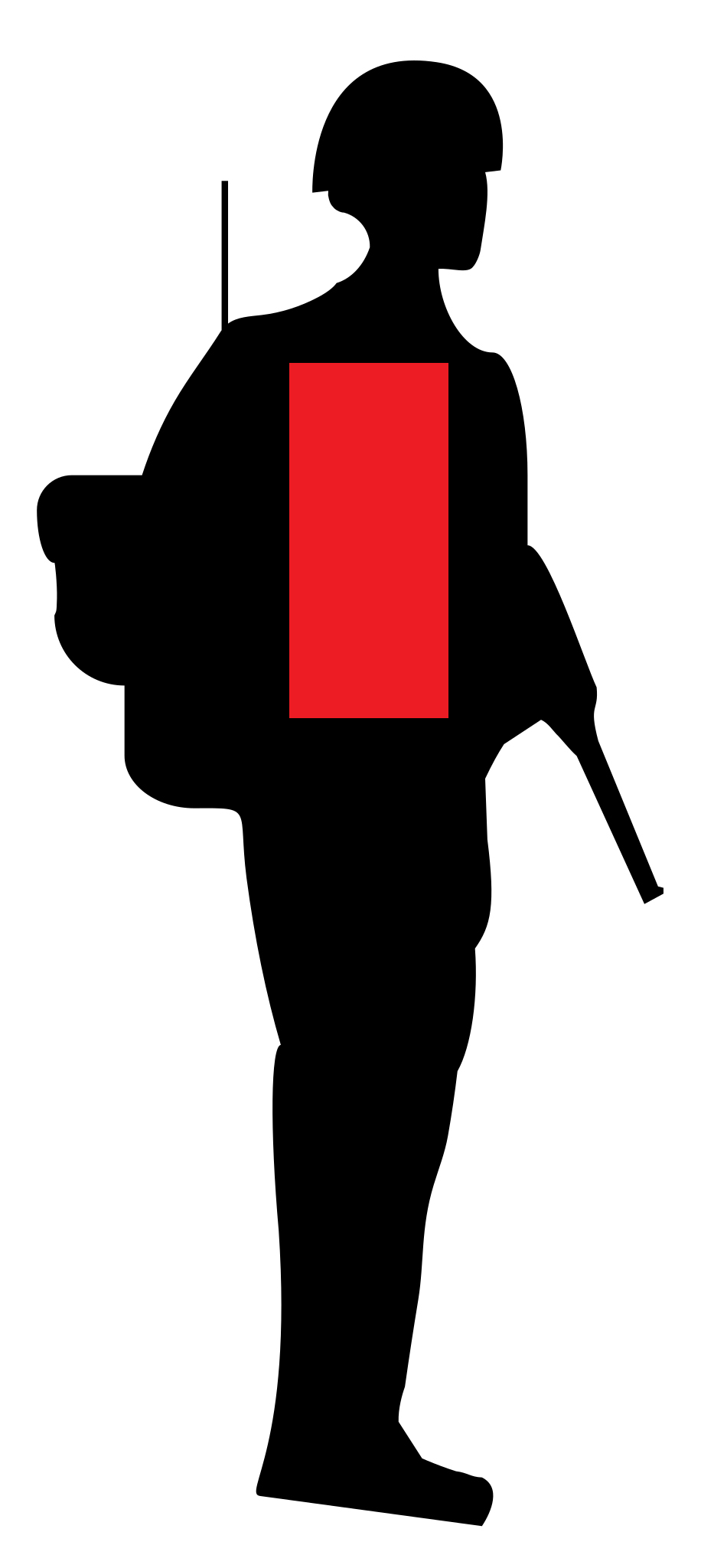
Torso Lethal Shot Placement rectangle of 450 × 225 mm (17.7 × 8.85 in) superimposed over a silhouetted soldier.

Small arms are often sighted in so that their sight line and bullet path are within a certain acceptable margin out to the longest possible range, called the maximum point-blank range. Maximum point-blank range is principally a function of a cartridge's external ballistics and target size: high-velocity rounds have long point-blank ranges, while slow rounds have much shorter point-blank ranges. Target size determines how far above and below the line of sight a projectile's trajectory may deviate. Other considerations include sight height and acceptable drop before a shot is ineffective.

==== Hunting ====
A large target, like the vitals area of a deer, allows a deviation of a few inches (as much as 10 cm) while still ensuring a quickly disabling hit. Vermin such as prairie dogs require a much smaller deviation, less than an inch (about 2 cm). The height of the sights has two effects on point blank range. If the sights are lower than the allowable deviation, then point blank range starts at the muzzle, and any difference between the sight height and the allowable deviation is lost distance that could have been in point blank range. Higher sights, up to the maximum allowable deviation, push the maximum point blank range farther from the gun. Sights that are higher than the maximum allowable deviation push the start of the point blank range farther out from the muzzle; this is common with varmint rifles, where close shots are only sometimes made, as it places the point blank range out to the expected range of the usual targets.

==== Military ====
Known also as "battle zero", maximum point-blank range is crucial in the military. Soldiers are instructed to fire at any target within this range by simply placing their weapon's sights on the center of mass of the enemy target. Any errors in range estimation are effectively irrelevant, as a well-aimed shot will hit the torso of the enemy soldier. No height correction is needed at the "battle zero" or less distance, but it can result in a headshot or even a complete miss. The belt buckle is used as battle zero point of aim in Russian and former Soviet military doctrine.

The first mass-produced assault rifle, the World War II StG 44, and its preceding prototypes had iron sight lines elevated over the bore axis to extend point-blank range. The current trend for elevated sights and flatter shooting higher-velocity cartridges in assault rifles is in part due to a desire to further extend the maximum point-blank range, which makes the rifle easier to use. Raising the sight line 48.5 to 66 mm (1.9 to 2.6 in) over the bore axis, introduces an inherent parallax problem as the projectile path crosses the horizontal sighting plane twice. The point closest to the gun occurs while the bullet is climbing through the line of sight and is called the near zero. The second point occurs as the projectile is descending through the line of sight and is called the far zero. At closer ranges under the near zero range (typically inside 15 to 25 m (16 to 27 yd)), the shooter must aim high to place shots where desired.

== See also ==
- Table of handgun and rifle cartridges
