= Franklin Mann =

Franklin Mann may refer to:

- Franklin B. Mann (born 1941), American politician in the state of Florida
- Franklin Ware Mann (1856–1916), American physician and inventor
