= List of government animal eradication programs =

Historically, there have been cases where the extermination of animal species has been politically endorsed because the animals have been considered harmful. In some cases the animals have been hunted because the animals present a danger to human lives, at other times they have been hunted because they are harmful to human interests such as livestock farming. More recently, eradication efforts have focused on invasive vertebrates as they are the leading cause of extinction of native species, particularly on islands. This article refers to animals in a more limited sense; it does not include humans.

In a number of cases, such government endorsed hunting has led to the endangerment or outright extinction of the species.

== Rat ==
Alberta, Canada is one of the few non-island places in the world that is free of brown rats. Since the early 1950s, the Government of Alberta has operated a rat-control program, which has been so successful that only isolated instances of wild rat sightings are reported, usually of rats arriving in the province aboard trucks or by rail.

A number of islands have had programs to remove introduced rats and improve conditions for native fauna. Some of these islands include:

- Breaksea Island and Campbell Island, New Zealand have successfully eradicated brown rats. The program was carried out by the New Zealand Department of Conservation (DOC).
- Pinzón Island, one of the Galápagos Islands has a rat eradication program which has contributed to a rebound in Galápagos tortoise populations there.
- Hawadax Island in the western Aleutian Islands in the US state of Alaska also had a successful rat eradication program in the 2000s.

== Thylacine ==
- The thylacine was a Tasmanian predator which was responsible for a significant number of attacks on unconfined livestock, leading to a public sentiment of hostility against the species. A bounty of between 6/- (for fewer than ten kills) and 10/- (for each kill beyond ten) on the thylacine was established by the Van Diemen's Land Co in 1836. In 1888 the government introduced a bounty of £1 for each adult scalp, and 10/- per juvenile, and a number of sheep farmers offered similar rewards. The subsequent slaughter of the animals was a key factor in their extinction.

== Tiger ==
=== Caspian tiger ===
- In the 1900s (decade) the Russian government declared that there is no place for tigers in Central Asia and Caucasus. The Russian army was tasked with the extermination of all tigers in the Caspian Sea area so that farmers could move in. It is unknown whether the Caspian tiger is entirely extinct since there are some reports of sightings in Afghanistan.

=== South China tiger ===
- In 1950 the population of the South China tiger was approximately 4000. The species was declared a pest by Mao Zedong as part of the Great Leap Forward programme and subjected to uncontrolled hunting. This hunting, combined with the ravages of deforestation led to the dramatic reduction of the Chinese tiger population. Regulations restricting the hunting of such tigers were implemented during the 1970s but they were not greatly respected. By 1982 their numbers had dwindled to 150–200, and now they are almost extinct in the wild.

== Wolf ==
- Wolves are predators which frequently target domestic sheep, a fact which frequently brings sheep farmers who want the wolves gone into conflict with conservationists. In various European countries such as Norway, the wolf was declared a pest and subjected to systematic eradication. In Japan during the Meiji Period, hunting of the wolves in Hokkaidō led to the extinction of the Japanese subspecies. The same event happened to the wolf subspecies on Honshu.

== Multiple species ==
New Zealand's Predator Free 2050 aims to eradicate all introduced predators from the islands.

== See also ==
- Mosquito control
- Nuisance wildlife management
- South Atlantic Invasive Species Project
