= Adolph Otto Niedner =

American gunsmith (1863–1954)

- Born: October 1, 1863; Philadelphia, Pennsylvania, U.S.
- Died: December 27, 1954 (aged 91); Dowagiac, Michigan
- Occupation: Gunsmith

Adolph Otto Niedner (October 1, 1863 – December 27, 1954) was an American gunsmith remembered for pioneering work with cartridges including the .22 Long Rifle and .25-06 Remington.

== Early life ==
Niedner was born in Philadelphia to German immigrants, Carl Heinrich Niedner and Augusta W. (Trapp) Niedner. He enlisted in the United States Army in 1880 and fought against the Apache uprisings led by Victorio and Geronimo. He was discharged in 1883 with a scar from a scalp wound. He served on the Milwaukee, Wisconsin police force until moving to Malden, Massachusetts in 1899 to work as a weaver in his father's business manufacturing linen socks.

== Gunsmith ==
Niedner opened a gunsmith shop in Malden in 1906. Niedner worked with members of the Massachusetts Rifle Association, including gun barrel-maker Harry Pope, making tools and rifles for ballistics expert Franklin Ware Mann, and prototype Patridge gun sights for inventor Eugene Patridge. Niedner moved to Dowagiac, Michigan in 1920 to establish the Niedner Rifle Company, and was elected mayor of Dowagiac in 1926. Niedner specialized in chambering and single-shot rifles. Niedner manufactured custom rifles for many noted riflemen including Townsend Whelen, Charles Newton, and Ned Roberts. Niedner sold the business following the death of his wife, Josephine C. (Josie), in 1940; and lived alone in Dowagiac until death from a heart attack on December 27, 1954.
