= .219 Zipper =

Rifle cartridge

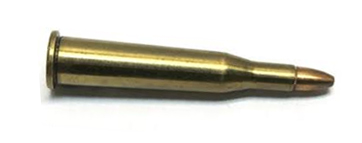
- .219 Zipper
- Type: Rifle
- Place of origin: United States

Production history
- Designed: 1937
- Manufacturer: Winchester Repeating Arms
- Produced: 1938-1962
- Variants: .219 Donaldson Wasp, .219 Zipper Improved

Specifications
- Parent case: .30-30 Winchester
- Case type: Rimmed
- Bullet diameter: .2245 in (5.70 mm)
- Neck diameter: .253 in (6.4 mm)
- Shoulder diameter: .365 in (9.3 mm)
- Base diameter: .422 in (10.7 mm)
- Rim diameter: .506 in (12.9 mm)
- Rim thickness: .063 in (1.6 mm)
- Case length: 1.938 in (49.2 mm)
- Overall length: 2.260 in (57.4 mm)
- Case capacity: 34 gr H_{2}O (2.2 cm^{3})
- Rifling twist: 1 in 14 in (360 mm)
- Primer type: large rifle
- Maximum pressure: 42,000 psi (290 MPa)

Ballistic performance
Bullet mass/type	Velocity	Energy
46 gr (3 g) Speer flat nosed	3,220 ft/s (980 m/s)	1,059 ft⋅lbf (1,436 J)
50 gr (3 g) Hornady SX spire point	3,194 ft/s (974 m/s)	1,133 ft⋅lbf (1,536 J)
55 gr (4 g) Nosler Spitzer boat tail	3,097 ft/s (944 m/s)	1,172 ft⋅lbf (1,589 J)
- Test barrel length: 26; Source(s): Accurate Arms

The .219 Zipper / 5.7x49mmR cartridge was created by Winchester Repeating Arms in 1937 to be used in their lever-action Model 64 rifle. It is a 30-30 Winchester cartridge necked down to a .22 caliber bullet. Marlin Firearms also offered their Marlin Model 336 rifle (Marlin 336 Zipper) chambered for the cartridge.

While the .219 Zipper was supposed to compete against other varmint cartridges of the time, most lever-action rifles use tubular magazines, which prohibit the use of pointed bullets. This led to problems with accuracy. Winchester stopped producing .219 Zipper ammunition in 1962, Remington Arms stopped production of the cartridge soon afterwards. The .219 Zipper is the parent case of the .219 Donaldson Wasp, and P.O. Ackley created the .219 Zipper Improved in 1937. Leslie Lindahl's Chucker and Super-chucker and "wildcat" case modifications by Hervey Lovell, Lysle Kilbourne, and W. F. Vickery offered similarly superior ballistics in stronger single-shot and bolt actions.

Though the flat- or round-nosed slug causes rapid loss of velocity, the .219 Zipper is suitable for small game or varmints, including wolf or coyote, and even deer if loaded with a heavier 55 grain bullet. It works well in guns designed to fire rimmed ammunition, such as rebarreled Steyr-Mannlicher M1895s or Lee–Enfields, but not in Mauser-type actions, which are not, although Winchester's Model 70, also a Mauser-type action, had been successfully adapted to semi- and fully-rimmed cartridges, such as the .220 Swift and the .219 Zipper.

== Note ==
The ballistics data in the infobox are for maximum loads, as determined by the writers for Accurate Arms. This was based upon the Winchester Model 64 rifle being chambered in .25-35 WCF and .30-30 Winchester rather than SAAMI specifications.

== See also ==
- List of rifle cartridges
