= .225 Winchester =

Rifle cartridge

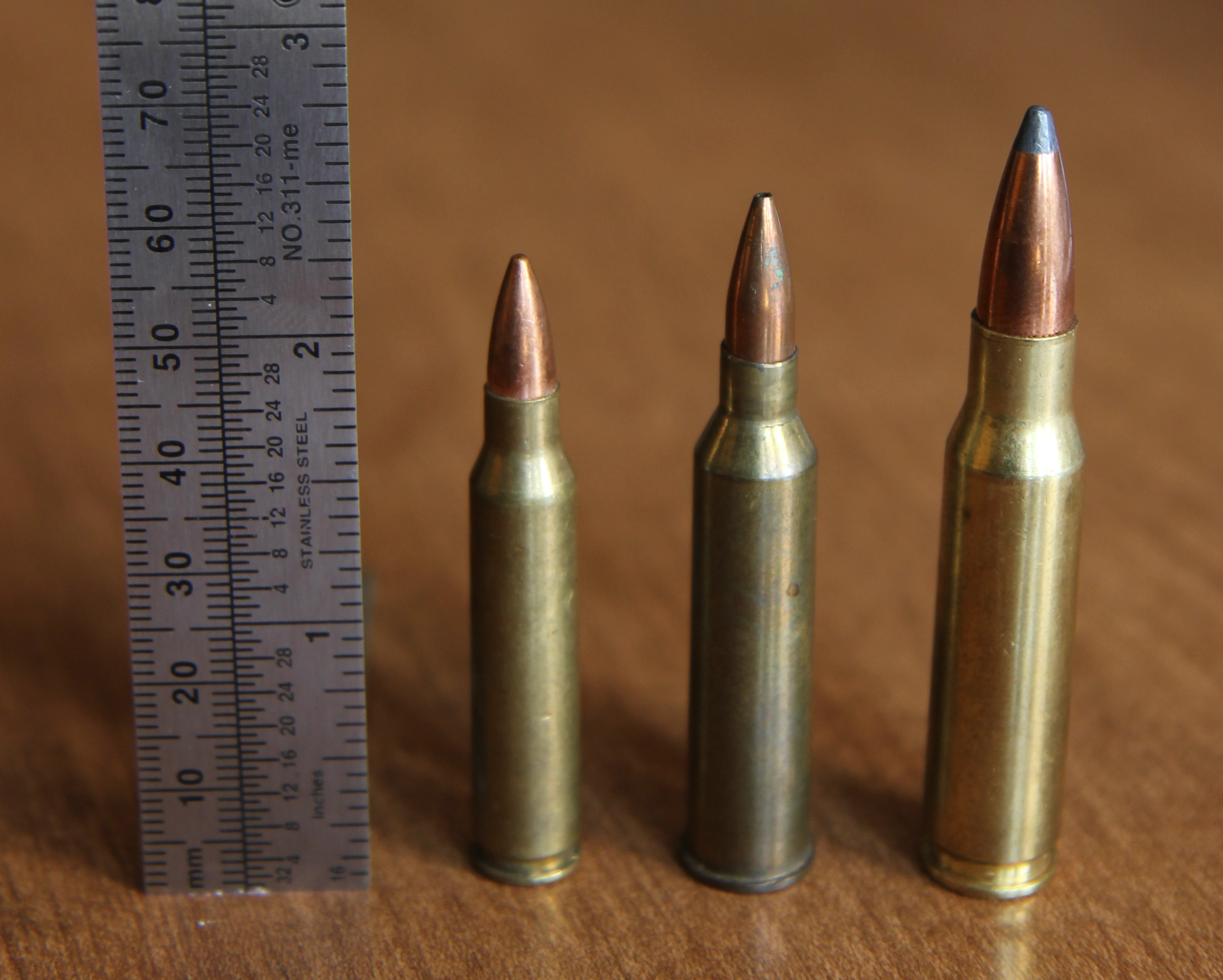
- .225 Winchester center with .223 Rem (left) and .308 Win (right)
- Type: Rifle
- Place of origin: USA

Production history
- Designer: Winchester
- Designed: 1964

Specifications
- Parent case: .219 Zipper
- Case type: rimmed, bottleneck
- Bullet diameter: .224 in (5.7 mm)
- Neck diameter: .260 in (6.6 mm)
- Shoulder diameter: .406 in (10.3 mm)
- Base diameter: .422 in (10.7 mm)
- Rim diameter: .473 in (12.0 mm)
- Rim thickness: .049 in (1.2 mm)
- Case length: 1.930 in (49.0 mm)
- Overall length: 2.50 in (64 mm)
- Rifling twist: 1-12"
- Primer type: Large rifle
- Maximum CUP: 50,000 CUP

Ballistic performance
Bullet mass/type	Velocity	Energy
40 gr (3 g) SP	4,020 ft/s (1,230 m/s)	1,436 ft⋅lbf (1,947 J)
50 gr (3 g) SP	3,768 ft/s (1,148 m/s)	1,577 ft⋅lbf (2,138 J)
55 gr (4 g) SP	3,643 ft/s (1,110 m/s)	1,621 ft⋅lbf (2,198 J)
60 gr (4 g) SP	3,428 ft/s (1,045 m/s)	1,566 ft⋅lbf (2,123 J)
- Test barrel length: 24"; Source: Hodgdon

The .225 Winchester / 5.7x49mm cartridge was introduced in 1964 by the Winchester Repeating Arms Company.

== Description ==
The .225 Winchester cartridge was derived from the .219 Zipper case, though its rim diameter was reduced to accommodate the standard .473-inch bolt face. It was developed with the goal of supplanting the .220 Swift, a cartridge that had earned a reputation for accelerated barrel erosion. Although the .225 Winchester featured a more modern, straight-tapered case design, it was ultimately overshadowed in popularity by the older .22-250 Remington, which had already gained widespread acceptance as a wildcat cartridge before being commercially standardized one year later.

Factory rifles chambered for the .225 Winchester were produced by Winchester—notably the Model 70 and Model 670—as well as by Savage Arms in the Model 340. All mass-produced firearms offered in this chambering were either bolt-action or break-action designs. Winchester discontinued rifle production in .225 Winchester in 1971; however, the company has continued limited seasonal manufacturing of factory ammunition and cartridge cases. Reloading dies remain commonly available, and cartridge brass can also be formed from .30-30 Winchester cases with appropriate modification.

The .225 Winchester's case is a parent case for some of SSK Industries' popular line of JDJ cartridges designed by J.D. Jones, chosen for its strength and semi-rimmed design which makes it well suited for use in break-open actions.

== See also ==
- .224 Weatherby Magnum
- 5 mm caliber
- List of rifle cartridges
- Table of handgun and rifle cartridges
