= .220 Swift =

Rifle cartridge

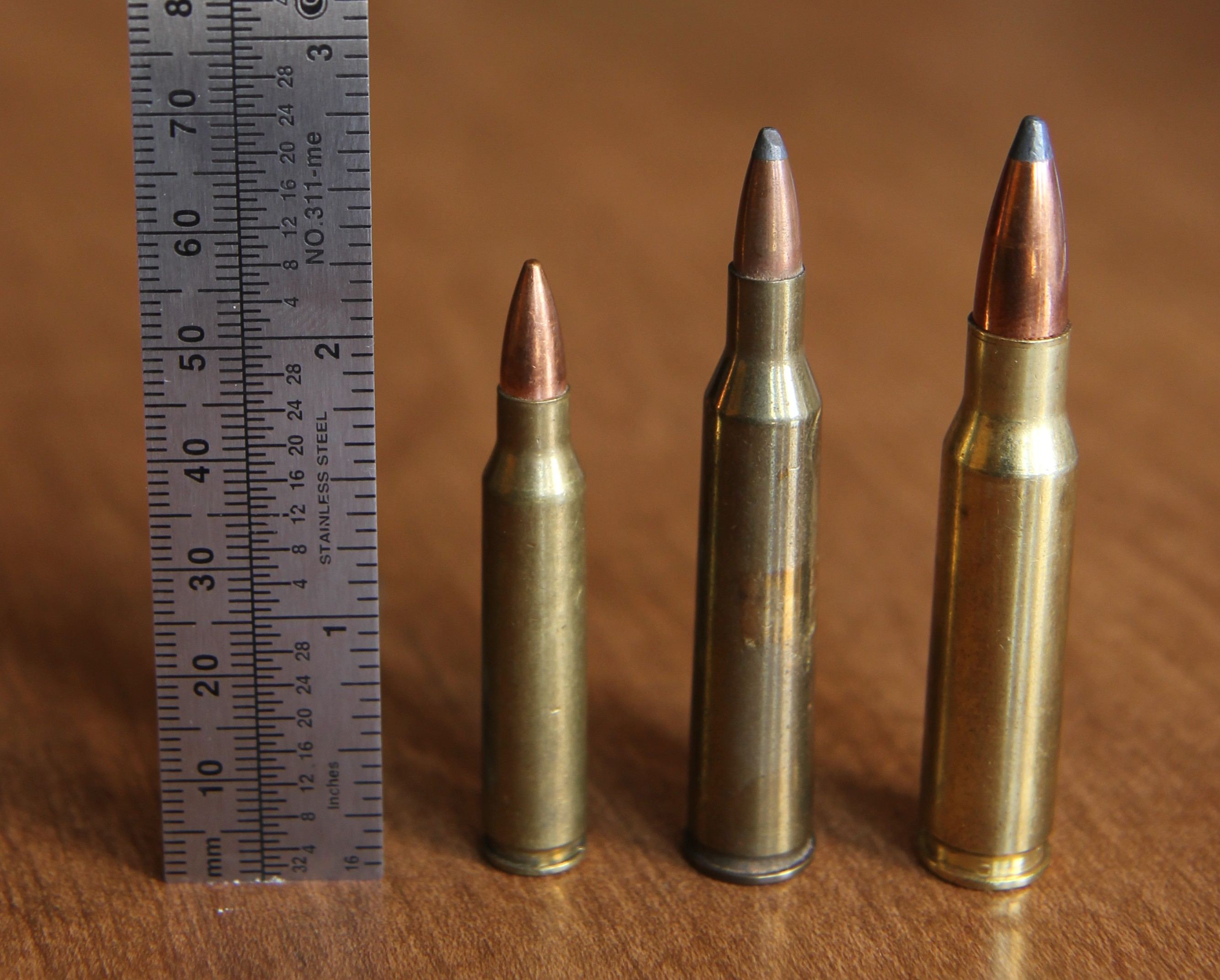
- .220 Swift (center) with .223 Rem (left) and .308 Win (right)
- Type: Rifle
- Place of origin: United States

Production history
- Designer: Winchester
- Designed: 1935
- Manufacturer: Winchester
- Produced: 1935–present
- Variants: Wilson-Wotkyns .220 Arrow

Specifications
- Parent case: 6mm Lee Navy
- Case type: Semi-rimmed, bottleneck
- Bullet diameter: .224 in (5.7 mm)
- Neck diameter: .260 in (6.6 mm)
- Shoulder diameter: .402 in (10.2 mm)
- Base diameter: .445 in (11.3 mm)
- Rim diameter: .473 in (12.0 mm)
- Case length: 2.205 in (56.0 mm)
- Overall length: 2.680, 2.580 H.P. bullets
- Case capacity: 47 gr H_{2}O (3.0 cm^{3})
- Rifling twist: 1 in 14–16 in (360–410 mm)
- Primer type: Large rifle
- Maximum pressure: 62,000 psi (430 MPa)
- Maximum CUP: 54,000 CUP

Ballistic performance
Bullet mass/type	Velocity	Energy
40 gr (3 g) HP	4,213 ft/s (1,284 m/s)	1,577 ft⋅lbf (2,138 J)
50 gr (3 g) SP	3,947 ft/s (1,203 m/s)	1,800 ft⋅lbf (2,400 J)
55 gr (4 g) SP	3,839 ft/s (1,170 m/s)	1,800 ft⋅lbf (2,400 J)
60 gr (4 g) SP	3,647 ft/s (1,112 m/s)	1,772 ft⋅lbf (2,403 J)

The .220 Swift (5.56×56mmSR) is a semi-rimmed rifle cartridge developed by Winchester and introduced in 1935 for small game and varmint hunting. It was the first factory-loaded rifle cartridge with a muzzle velocity of over 1,200 m/s (4,000 ft/s).

== Description ==
The velocity of the cartridge ranges from 2,000 km/h (1,200 mph; 560 m/s; 1,800 ft/s) up to about 4,500 km/h (2,800 mph; 1,200 m/s; 4,100 ft/s). The Swift is a large-cased .224 caliber cartridge and bullet that was created for small game such as prairie dogs, groundhogs, marmots and other vermin (or "varmints" in the US). When introduced it was 1,400 ft/s (430 m/s) faster than its nearest varmint-hunting competitor, which was the .22 Hornet (originally .223 caliber in the earlier rifles and .224 caliber in most post WWII rifles). It was found to be an extremely accurate cartridge as well.

Due to its very high velocity its bullet drop allows precise sighting to ranges out to 375 yd (343 m), and it is still considered an excellent cartridge for taking varmints by experienced Swift shooters.

The original factory load from Winchester provided a 48-grain (3.1 g) bullet launched at 1,200 metres per second (4,100 ft/s). Handloaders could marginally improve on this but only at maximum loads. The Swift can be loaded with light bullets to reach 1,300 m/s (4,400 ft/s). In recent times 75-grain (4.9 g) .224" bullets have been developed for use in high velocity .22 caliber rifles for taking larger game and long-distance shooting. Heavier bullets perform best in rifles that have an appropriate rifling twist rate taking into consideration the diameter, length, and other physical properties of the projectile.

== History ==
The prototype for the .220 Swift was developed in 1934–35 by Grosvenor Wotkyns who necked down the .250-3000 Savage as a means of achieving very high velocities. However the final commercial version developed by Winchester is based on the 6mm Lee Navy cartridge necked down, but besides inheriting headspacing on its rim from the parent, a feature already considered obsolete by the 1930s, the protruding rim which complicates loading was even made larger to fit with 12mm-wide .30-06 bolt faces. The .220 Swift was developed by Winchester and introduced in 1935 as a new caliber for their Model 54 bolt-action rifle. When the Winchester Model 70 bolt action was first issued in 1936, the .220 Swift was one of the standard calibers offered and continued to be until 1964 when it was discontinued.

== Acceptance ==
The Swift has the dubious privilege of being possibly the most controversial of all the many .224" caliber cartridges, and has inspired equal heights of praise and criticism. Traditionalists have roundly condemned it as an overbore "barrel burner" which can wear out a chromoly barrel in as few as 200–300 rounds, especially if long strings of shots are fired from an increasingly hot barrel. Its supporters have maintained that the fault lies with poor-quality barrel steels and the failure of users to remove copper fouling after firing, and point to instances of rifles with fine-quality stainless steel barrels chambered for the Swift, which have maintained sub-MOA precision after well in excess of 4,000 shots. More popular, however, is the smaller and slightly lower velocity .22–250.

.220 Swift maximum C.I.P. cartridge dimensions. All measurements shown in metric (mm) and imperial (inch) systems of units.

== Drawbacks ==
Due to the cartridge being over capacity for the bore diameter and the extreme velocity of the projectiles, throat erosion is a common problem. Modern metallurgy and cryogenic treatment have vastly improved barrel life with the .220 Swift and other 4,000 ft/s (1,200 m/s) cartridges, although weapons firing these cartridges still usually require rechambering or rebarreling much sooner than those firing lower-velocity cartridges such as the .222 Remington and the .223 Remington.

== Hunting controversy ==
The Swift remains a controversial deer caliber. Its use is prohibited in some US states and much of Europe, including England, Wales and Northern Ireland for large deer such as red, sika and fallow, but two-thirds of the United States, such as Minnesota, Idaho and Montana, currently allow smaller caliber rounds like the .220 Swift to be used. It is legal for use on game in New Zealand and Australia.

In the cartridge's early days in the 1930s, its killing power on large ungulates was extolled by famous Scottish hunter W. D. M. Bell for stalking red deer as well as Alaskan wildlife control officer Frank Glaser. This was attributed by gun writers to massive hydrostatic shock waves set up in the animal's body by the impact of the very high-velocity bullet. However, Bell considered the Swift to be a risky cartridge for the normal heart or lung shot, as the light high velocity bullet was liable to break apart if it hit large bones. When hunting red deer he almost exclusively shot for the neck.

Critics of the Swift have maintained that the light, 50-or-55-grain (3.2 or 3.6 g), bullet leaves an inadequate margin for error in bullet placement for the average deer shooter's skills, and thus invites wounding, which would have otherwise been avoidable. There is, however, little debate about the Swift's proven effectiveness on small deer species, such as roe, provided very fast-fragmenting "varmint"-type bullets are not used.

Most factory Swift rifles come with a fairly slow twist-rate such as 1–12 or 1–14 inch, designed to stabilize the lighter bullets popular in varmint hunting. Custom Swifts can have faster twist-rates such as 1–9 inch allowing them to stabilize heavy bullets, including those with a construction suitable for larger game.

P. O. Ackley maintained that the .220 Swift was a fine round for medium-large game and used it extensively, for example when culling wild burros in the American West.

Famous Alaskan wildlife control officer Frank Glaser also utilized the caliber extensively on all sorts of big game, including moose, caribou, Dall sheep and wolves. Glaser claimed that with lung shots the Swift would produce more instantaneous kills than any other cartridge he had ever used. He considered the light 48 grain bullet inadequate against grizzly bears though, and although he killed several with the Swift, on one occasion it took eleven shots to put down a sow that had attacked him.

== See also ==
- 5 mm caliber, other cartridges of 5–6 mm (.200–.236 in) caliber
- Delta L problem
- List of rifle cartridges
- Table of handgun and rifle cartridges
- Varmint rifle
