= Harry Melville Pope =

American gunsmith (1861–1950)

- Born: August 15, 1861; Walpole, New Hampshire, U.S.
- Died: October 11, 1950 (aged 89); Jersey City, New Jersey, U.S.
- Occupation: Gunsmith

Harry Melville Pope (August 15, 1861 – October 11, 1950) was an American gunsmith remembered for manufacturing precision rifle barrels.

== Early life ==
Pope was born in 1861 at Walpole, New Hampshire. His family moved to Worcester, Massachusetts, in 1862 where his mother died in 1867 and his father died in 1868. He was raised in Newton, Massachusetts, by his extended family including his aunts, Drs. Emily and C. Augusta Pope who were among the first women physicians in the United States. Harry learned mechanical skills working in the shop where his Uncle Albert Pope manufactured bicycles. At age 12 he used the bicycle shop tools to rifle a brass barrel for an air-powered dart gun. He graduated from the Massachusetts Institute of Technology in 1881 with a mechanical engineering degree, and worked for his Uncle at the Pope Manufacturing Company until 1904. During that time he acted as plant manager and also helped build the original Pope Electric Carriage

== Gunsmith ==
Pope won a shooting match in 1887 using a rifle barrel he had crafted. He spent the remainder of his life attempting to make the best possible rifle barrels. He competed in offhand shooting matches, but used bench rests when testing his barrel designs. His preferred design was 8-groove rifling with narrow lands and a groove depth of 0.004 in (0.10 mm). Pope minimized deformation of the base of bullets by loading cartridges into the breech while loading bullets through a removable muzzle extension. After leaving his position as superintendent of the Pope Manufacturing Company in Hartford, Connecticut, to focus on building gun barrels, he opened a gun shop in San Francisco, California. When his gun shop was destroyed by the 1906 San Francisco earthquake, Pope moved to Jersey City, New Jersey, where he hand-crafted up to fifty barrels per year beginning in 1907. His rifle barrels were used by noted riflemen including Franklin Ware Mann, Townsend Whelen, and Ned Roberts.
