= .257 Roberts =

Rifle cartridge

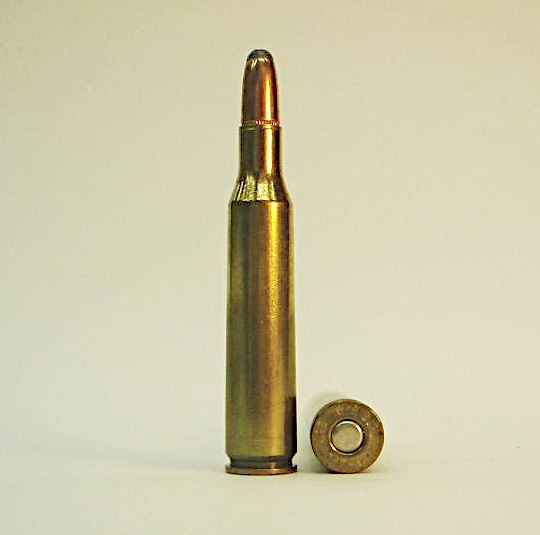
- Type: Rifle
- Place of origin: United States

Production history
- Designer: Ned Roberts
- Designed: 1920s
- Manufacturer: Remington Arms
- Produced: 1934–present
- Variants: .257 Roberts +P.257 Roberts Ackley Improved

Specifications
- Parent case: 7×57mm Mauser
- Case type: Rimless, bottleneck
- Bullet diameter: .257 in (6.5 mm)
- Neck diameter: .290 in (7.4 mm)
- Shoulder diameter: .430 in (10.9 mm)
- Base diameter: .472 in (12.0 mm)
- Rim diameter: .473 in (12.0 mm)
- Case length: 2.233 in (56.7 mm)
- Overall length: 2.775 in (70.5 mm)
- Rifling twist: 1-10"
- Primer type: Large rifle
- Maximum pressure (SAAMI): 54,000 psi (370 MPa)
- Maximum pressure (SAAMI (+P)): 58,000 psi (400 MPa)

Ballistic performance
Bullet mass/type	Velocity	Energy
75 gr (5 g) HP	3,450 ft/s (1,050 m/s)	1,983 ft⋅lbf (2,689 J)
100 gr (6 g) B-TIP	3,020 ft/s (920 m/s)	2,025 ft⋅lbf (2,746 J)
117 gr (8 g) SPBT	2,840 ft/s (870 m/s)	2,096 ft⋅lbf (2,842 J)
- Test barrel length: 24; Source: Accurate Powders

The .257 Roberts, also known as .257 Bob, is a medium-powered .25 caliber rifle cartridge. It has been described as the best compromise between the low recoil and flat trajectory of smaller calibers such as the 5 mm (.22 in) and 6 mm (.24 in), and has more energy, but is harder recoiling, similar to larger hunting calibers, such as the 7 mm (.28 in) and 7.62 mm (.30 in).

Nominal bullet diameter of the .257 Roberts is .257 inches (6.5 mm). The .257 Roberts uses the same caliber bullets as .250 Savage or the more powerful .25-06 Remington. Barrel rifling diameter, from which calibers derive their designations, is 0.250 inches (6.35 mm).

== History ==
Many cartridge designers in the 1920s were creating various 6.35 mm (.25 in) caliber cartridges. Due to the availability of inexpensive Mauser actions, the 7×57mm Mauser case was a common choice, having near ideal volume capacity for the "quarter-bore" (0.25 in; 6.35 mm) using powders available at that time. Ned Roberts is usually credited with being the designer for this cartridge. Eventually, in 1934, Remington Arms chose to introduce their own commercial version of such a cartridge, and although it was not the exact dimensions of the wildcat made by Roberts, they called it the ".257 Roberts".

From its introduction until the appearance of 6 mm cartridges such as .243 Winchester and 6mm Remington, it was a very popular general purpose cartridge. Today, although surpassed in popularity by other cartridges, it lives on with bolt-action rifles being available from some major manufacturers.

== Conversion of war-souvenir Japanese Arisaka rifles ==
Japanese Type 38 Arisaka rifles brought to the United States as wartime souvenirs were sometimes converted by rechambering to utilize more readily available .257 Roberts cartridge cases because commercially produced 6.5×50mm Arisaka cartridges were scarce prior to distribution by Norma Projektilfabrik A/S. The neck of the Roberts case would be slightly enlarged to accept handloaded 6.5 mm bullets. The modified Roberts cases are sometimes known as "6.5×.257 Roberts", although the case headstamp may still indicate .257 Roberts. Neither unmodified .257 Roberts ammunition nor the original 6.5×50mm Arisaka ammunition are suitable for firing in rechambered Arisaka rifles.

== Performance ==
With light bullets, the .257 produces little recoil, and has a flat trajectory suitable for varmint hunting. With heavier bullets it produces more recoil, but is capable of taking all but the largest North American game animals. The original factory load for this is very similar to the .250-3000 Savage.

== Improved cartridges ==
Remington introduced the commercial version of this popular wildcat as a low-pressure round. At the time there were many older actions available of questionable strength. With a modern action and handloading, this cartridge is capable of markedly improved performance.

One of the common improvements is called the ".257 Roberts +P" which has a SAAMI maximum pressure limit of 58,000 psi (400 MPa) compared to the 54,000 psi (370 MPa) listed for the standard .257 Roberts. It is also the only rifle cartridge with an official "+P" designation.

P.O. Ackley said that the .257 Roberts Ackley Improved was probably the most useful all-around cartridge. Making an Ackley Improved cartridge usually meant modifying the chamber to have a steeper shoulder and blown-out sides to provide greater powder capacity while still allowing factory ammunition to be fired safely.

== Comparison ==
Data below shows sample muzzle velocities and muzzle energies for a 61 cm (24 in) test barrel, except .250-3000 Savage, which is for a 56 cm (22 in) test barrel and .257 Weatherby Magnum, which is for a 66 cm (26 in) test barrel.

Quick .25 in (6.35 mm) caliber comparison chart
Cartridge	Bullet weight (g)	Bullet weight (gr)	Muzzle velocity (m/s)	Muzzle velocity (ft/s)	Muzzle energy (J)	Muzzle energy (ft·lbf)
.250-3000 Savage	6.5 g	100 gr	887 m/s	2,911 ft/s	2,552 J	1,882 ft⋅lbf
.257 Roberts	6.5 g	100 gr	920 m/s	3,020 ft/s	2,746 J	2,025 ft⋅lbf
.257 Roberts +P	6.5 g	100 gr	940 m/s	3,090 ft/s	2,870 J	2,120 ft⋅lbf
.257 Roberts Ackley Improved	6.5 g	100 gr	983 m/s	3,226 ft/s	3,133 J	2,311 ft⋅lbf
.25 WSSM	6.5 g	100 gr	1,010 m/s	3,313 ft/s	3,305 J	2,438 ft⋅lbf
.25-06 Remington	6.5 g	100 gr	1,013 m/s	3,324 ft/s	3,327 J	2,454 ft⋅lbf
.257 Weatherby Magnum	6.5 g	100 gr	1,070 m/s	3,512 ft/s	3,714 J	2,739 ft⋅lbf

== See also ==
- 6 mm caliber
- Delta L problem
- List of rifle cartridges
- Table of handgun and rifle cartridges
