= Vermin =

Insects and animals that spread diseases or destroy crops or livestock

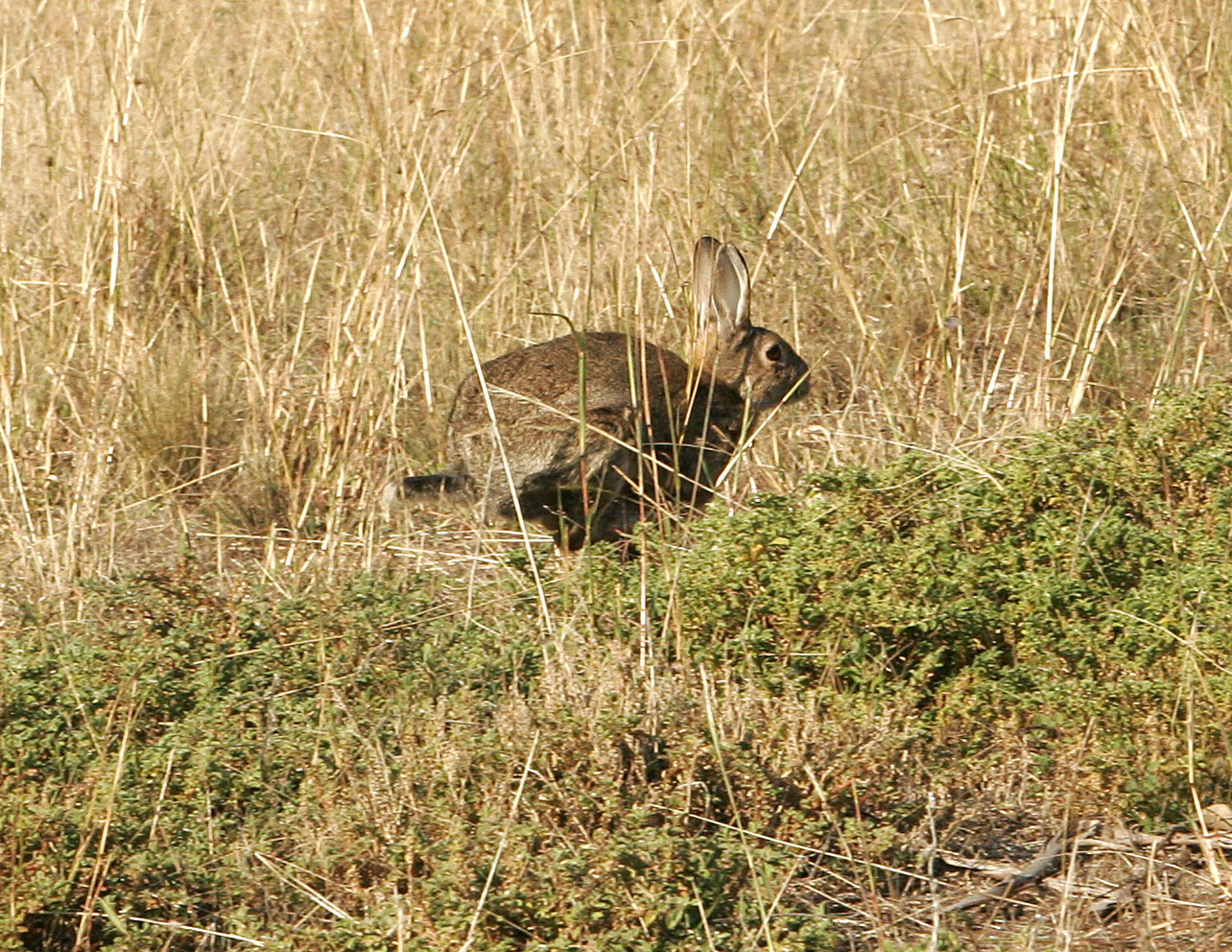
A wild rabbit – considered a pest by many, due to its destruction of farm crops

Vermin (colloquially varmint(s) or varmit(s)) are pests or nuisance animals that spread diseases and destroy crops, livestock, and property. Since the term is defined in relation to human activities, which species are included vary by region and enterprise.

The term derives from the Latin vermis (worm), and was originally used for the worm-like larvae of certain insects, many of which infest foodstuffs. The term varmint (and vermint) has been found in sources from c. 1530–1540s.

== Definition ==
The term "vermin" is used to refer to a wide scope of organisms, including rodents (such as rats and mice), cockroaches, termites, bed bugs, stoats, sables, crows, and pigeons.

Historically, in the 16th and 17th century, the expression also became used as a derogatory term associated with groups of persons typically plagued by vermin, namely beggars and vagabonds, and more generally the poor.

Disease-carrying rodents and insects are the usual case, but the term is also applied to larger animals—especially small predators—typically because they consume resources which humans consider theirs, such as livestock and crops. Birds which eat cereal crops and fruit are an example. The American crow (Corvus brachyrhynchos), is widely hated by farmers because of crop depredation. Pigeons, which have been widely introduced in urban environments, are also sometimes considered vermin. Some varieties of snakes and arachnids may also be referred to as vermin. "Vermin" is also used by some people as a term of abuse, either individually or collectively.

=== Varmint ===
Varmint or varmit is an American-English colloquialism, a corruption of "vermin" particularly common to the American East and South-east within the nearby bordering states of the vast Appalachia region. The term describes species which raid farms from without, as opposed to vermin (such as rats) that infest from within, thus referring mainly to predators such as feral dogs, foxes, weasels, and coyotes, sometimes even wolves or rarely bears, but also, to a lesser degree, herbivores and burrowing animals such as rabbits that directly damage crops and land.

Although "varmint/varmit" is not the prevalent usage in Standard Written English, it is a common descriptor for certain kinds of weapons and pest control situations in the Appalachian and nearby states and the American West and South-west which have adopted terms such as varmint rifle and varmint hunting.

== Deterioration of balance ==
Any species can develop into vermin if introduced into a region where there are favorable living conditions and few natural predators. In such cases, they are seen as an invasive species and humans often choose to fill the role of the predator to limit the danger to the environment. Examples of vermin include goats on the Galápagos Islands, rabbits in Australia or cats on Prince Edward Islands. Rats, mice, and cockroaches are common urban and suburban vermin. The introduction of hippopotamuses into Colombia by Pablo Escobar led to the hippos becoming an invasive species. The transplanted hippos thrived and flourished in Colombia due to the favorable living conditions and few predators leading to an invasively rapid increase of the hippo population.

== United Kingdom ==
Under Tudor "vermin laws", many creatures were seen as competitors for the produce of the countryside and bounties were paid by the parish for their carcasses. The declaration of the red kite as vermin led to its decline to the point of extirpation in the UK by the 20th century. However, the red kite has since been reintroduced to much of Scotland and the majority of England and Wales by the trans-location of breeding pairs from other parts of Europe.

== See also ==
- Parasite
- Pest
- Weed
