= .219 Donaldson Wasp =

Rifle cartridge

- Type: Rifle
- Place of origin: USA

Production history
- Designer: Harvey Donaldson
- Designed: 1940

Specifications
- Parent case: .219 Zipper
- Case type: rimmed, tapered, bottleneck
- Bullet diameter: 0.224 in (5.7 mm)
- Neck diameter: 0.250 in (6.4 mm)
- Shoulder diameter: 0.406 in (10.3 mm); Shoulder angle: 30 degrees
- Base diameter: 0.416 in (10.6 mm)
- Rim diameter: 0.506 in (12.9 mm)
- Rim thickness: 0.063 in (1.6 mm)
- Case length: 1.750 in (44.5 mm)
- Overall length: 2.250 in (57.2 mm)
- Rifling twist: 1-14 in (360 mm)
- Primer type: Large rifle

Ballistic performance
Bullet mass/type	Velocity	Energy
53 gr (3 g) Sierra	3,465 ft/s (1,056 m/s)	1,413 ft⋅lbf (1,916 J)
- Test barrel length: 24 in (610 mm)

The .219 Donaldson Wasp / 5.7x44mmR intermediate cartridge was developed during the late 1930s by Harvey Donaldson, and is derived from the .219 Zipper case. Cases have been formed from .25-35 Winchester, .30-30 Winchester, .32 Winchester Special, and .22 Savage Hi-Power brass. It quickly became very popular amongst benchrest shooters, with 70-80% of shooters winning matches using it. The introduction of the .222 Remington spelled the demise for the .219 Donaldson Wasp, though it remains a very capable cartridge for those interested in reloading.

== See also ==
- List of rifle cartridges
- List of rimmed cartridges
