= Varmint hunting =

Form of pest control

Varmint hunting or varminting is the practice of hunting vermin — generally small/medium-sized wild mammals or birds — as a means of pest control, rather than as game for food or trophy. The targeted animals are culled because they are considered economically harmful pests to agricultural crops, livestocks or properties; pathogen-carrying hosts/vectors that transmit cross-species/zoonotic diseases; or for population control as a mean of protecting other vulnerable species and ecosystems.

The term "varminter" may refer to a varmint hunter, or describe the hunting equipment (such as a varmint rifle) either specifically designed or coincidentally suitable for the practice of varmint hunting. Varmint hunters may hunt to exterminate a nuisance animal from their own property, to collect a bounty offered by another landowner or the government, or simply as a hobby.

== Targets of varmint hunting ==
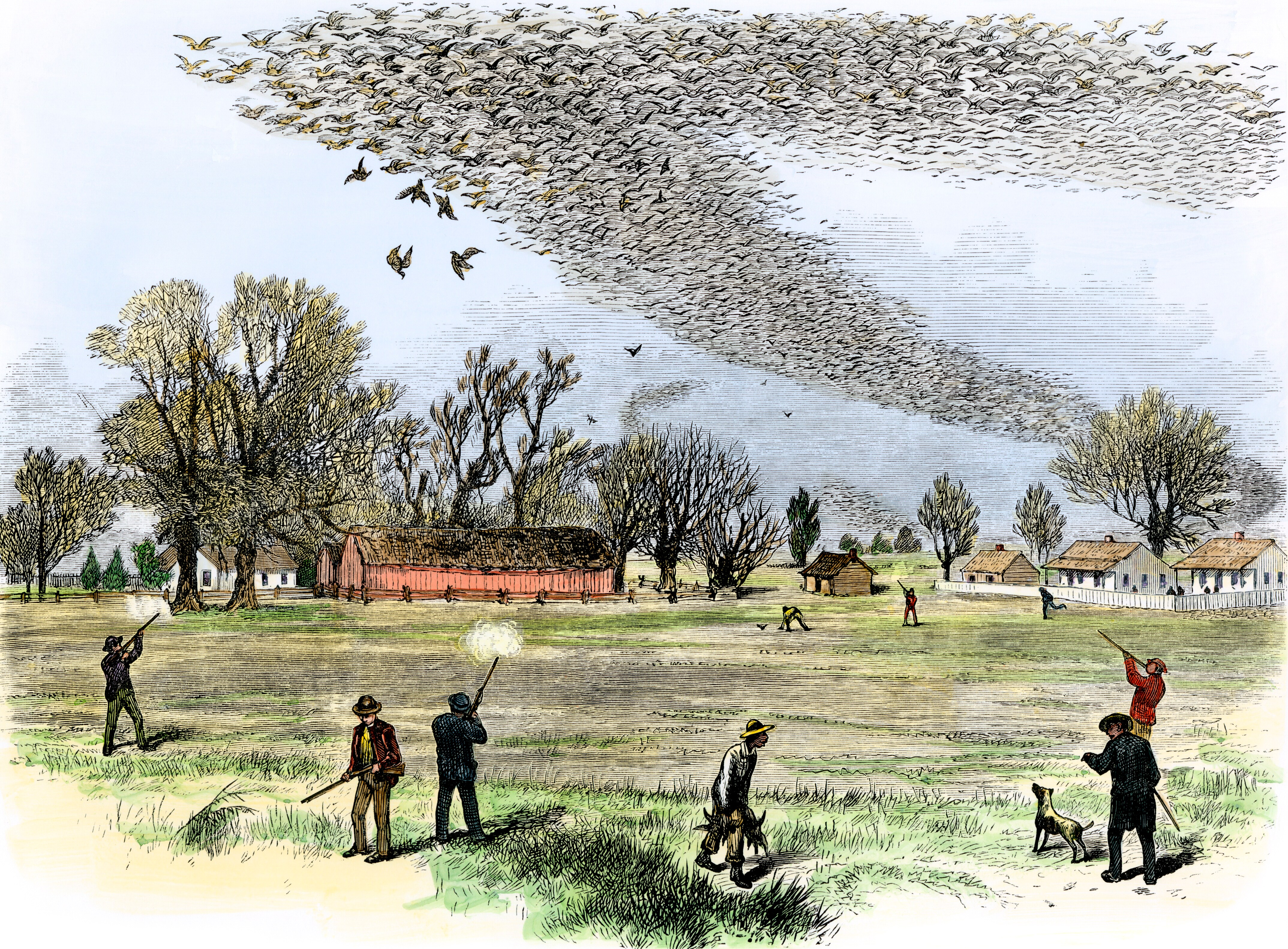
A contemporary wood engraving of varmint hunters shooting passenger pigeons, at the time a bird known to damage crops

The term varmint is a US colloquial term for vermin, though it refers more specifically to mammalian or avian pests, including:

- Predators which can kill/maim domestic animals: badger, coyote, foxes, mink, raccoons, snakes, snapping turtles, weasel, and wolverine
- Rodents and lagomorphs that can damage croplands or pastures: beaver, gophers, groundhogs, muskrat, coypu (also known as nutria), prairie dogs, porcupine, and rabbits
- Urban wildlife that can cause damage to buildings and properties, create mess/fecal pollutions, or carry disease: feral pigeons, rats, and squirrels
- Birds perceived as damaging to crops: crows and ravens, sparrows, as well as passenger pigeons and Carolina parakeets, one of which was driven to extinction in part by pressure from indiscriminate hunting
- Invasive species, such as starlings and wild boar/hogs, that are preying on or displacing desirable native species

== Equipment ==
=== Blowgun ===
Shorter blowguns and smaller bore darts were used for varmint hunting by pre-adolescent boys in traditional North American Cherokees villages. They used the blowguns to cut down on smaller raiding rodents such as rats, mice, chipmunks and other mammals that cut or gnaw into food caches, seed and vegetable stores, or that are attracted to the planted vegetables. While this custom gave the boys something to do around the village and kept them out of mischief, it also worked as an early form of pest control. Some food and skins were also obtained by the boys, who hunted squirrels with blowguns well into the 20th century.

=== Airgun ===
Air rifles are commonly used in built-up environments, where the targets might not be particularly far away but are high up on trees/structures or in obscure corners, and the risk of overpenetration, ricochets and stray shots need to be minimized. Airguns are more powerful and accurate than blowguns, but much quieter and with less terminal damage than firearms, and thus more suitable in urban and suburban environments where noise complaint and ballistic safety can be an issue.

=== Firearms ===
To reduce noise, flash, and hearing damage, silencers are sometimes employed on varmint rifles.

==== Examples ====
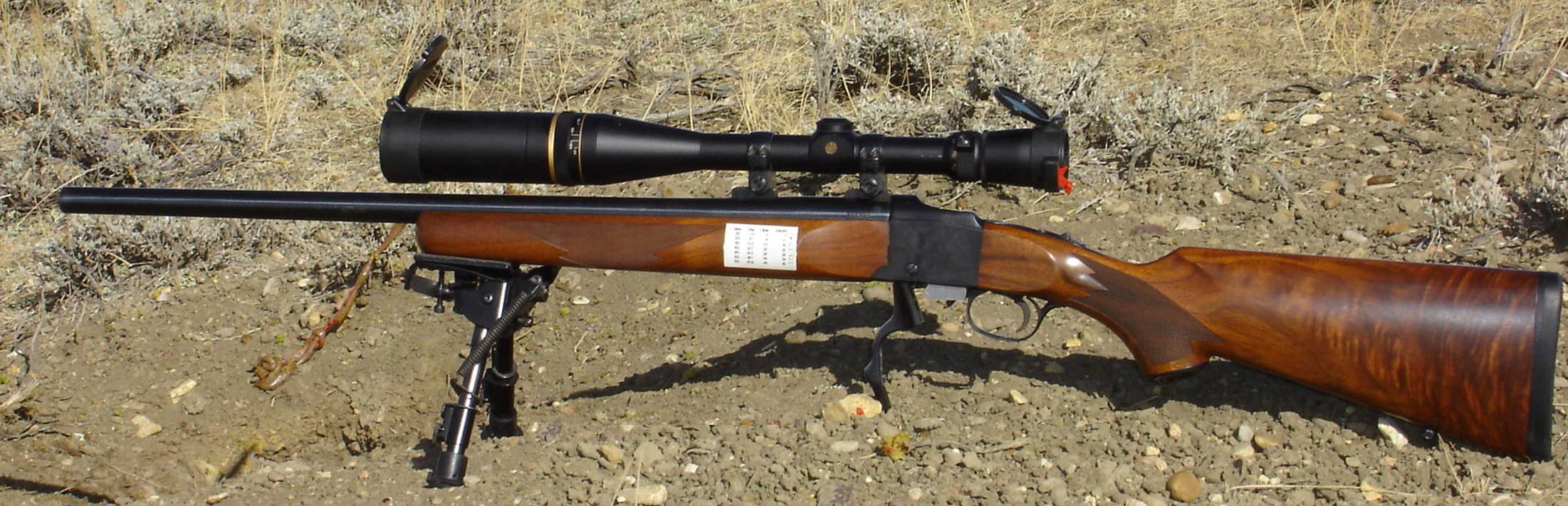
Ruger No. 1 Varmint rifle in .223 Remington with heavy barrel, bipod rest, large telescopic sight, and "dope" sheet on the stock for windage

- Bushmaster AR-15 based Varminter model; includes extended heavy barrel, adjustable trigger, and no iron sights (being designed for dedicated use with telescopic sights).
- Remington 700 SPS: Has a 26" heavy contour barrel with standard features that include a hinged floorplate magazine, sling swivel studs, and a drilled and tapped receiver.
- Ruger No. 1 Varminter single-shot rifle; equipped with scope base and rings for telescopic sight, available in high velocity calibers with extended heavy barrels. While the trigger is factory set and locked, the trigger does include sear engagement and overtravel adjustment screws, which can be adjusted by a gunsmith.
- Savage Model 12 Varminter; includes adjustable trigger, and free floated extended heavy barrel, no iron sights, and a benchrest style stock.
- Henry Repeating Arms Varmint Express .17 HMR: Features a high-comb Monte Carlo style buttstock optimized for use with a scope, fiber optic sights, and an 11-round capacity.

== Impacts on varmint populations ==
Hunting of varmint has typically been to reduce crop loss and to stop predation of livestock. This hunting has imposed an artificial selection pressure on the organisms being hunted. The selection pressure on varmints is probably for younger reproduction ages and earlier maturity. Varmint hunting is also potentially selecting for behavioral changes that are desired, animals avoiding human populated areas, crops, and livestock.

== See also ==
- Rat-catcher – Type of professional in pest control
