= Nuisance wildlife management =

Selective removal of problem individuals or populations of specific species

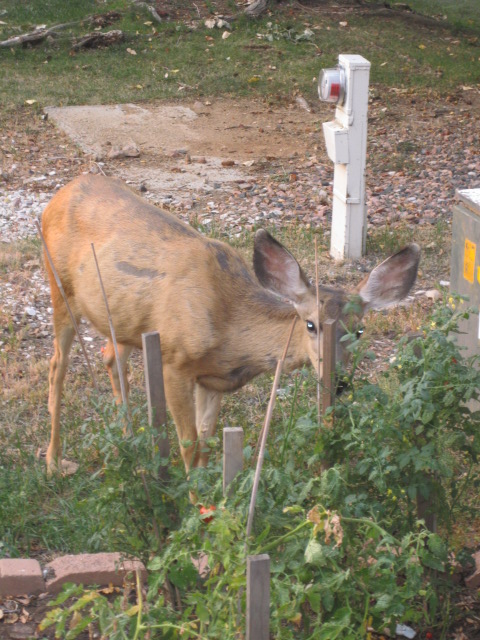
Mule deer eating cultivated tomato plant

Nuisance wildlife management is the selective removal, dispersal, or deterrence of wild animals which present a danger to human life or property, or are otherwise deemed likely to cause damage. Other terms include wildlife damage management, wildlife control, and animal damage control. Nuisance wildlife management may be needed to mitigate damage to crops, property, or infrastructure, to relocate individuals who become habituated to human presence, or removing animals which pose a high risk of transferring diseases (zoonoses) to humans or pets, among others.

== Common nuisance species ==
Human–wildlife conflict, and thus the need for wildlife management, can arise anywhere that human activities encroach on wildlife habitat. Across much of the world, this includes private homes and gardens, commercial properties, parks and recreational facilities, agriculture, and transportation infrastructure. These problems are exacerbated when animals can find food (e.g., unsecured trash bins; food left out for pets) or shelter (e.g., lumber piles; outbuildings) associated with human occupation of an area.

In most settings, human–wildlife conflict arises from close contact with birds, mammals, or invertebrates. In many parts of the world, venomous snakes in or near homes may also require intervention. In some locales, particular nuisance species are protected (e.g., native birds in the United States under the Migratory Bird Treaty Act) and require permits to remove them.

=== Birds ===
Great spotted woodpecker on utility pole in Newport, Wales

- Woodpeckers: damage siding of lumber buildings, utility poles
- Birds impacting vegetable crops (e.g., blackbirds, starlings, corvids)
- Birds impacting seed crops (e.g., blackbirds, parrots, pigeons)
- Birds depredating aquaculture facilities, fisheries (e.g., herons, storks, cormorants/shags)

=== Mammals ===
- Bears: property damage when searching for food; danger to humans
- Rodents: cohabitation with humans poses risk of disease transmission
  - Tree squirrels: damage to electrical infrastructure
- Feral swine: soil destabilization, agricultural damage, disease transmission, vehicle collisions
- Cervids (deer): agricultural damage, vehicle collisions

=== Herpetofauna ===
- Crocodylians: risk to outdoor pets, humans
- Snakes: damage to electrical infrastructure,, risk to pets, humans from venomous species

=== Invertebrates ===
- Termites: damage to wooden structures
- Moths: crop damage, damage to fabrics

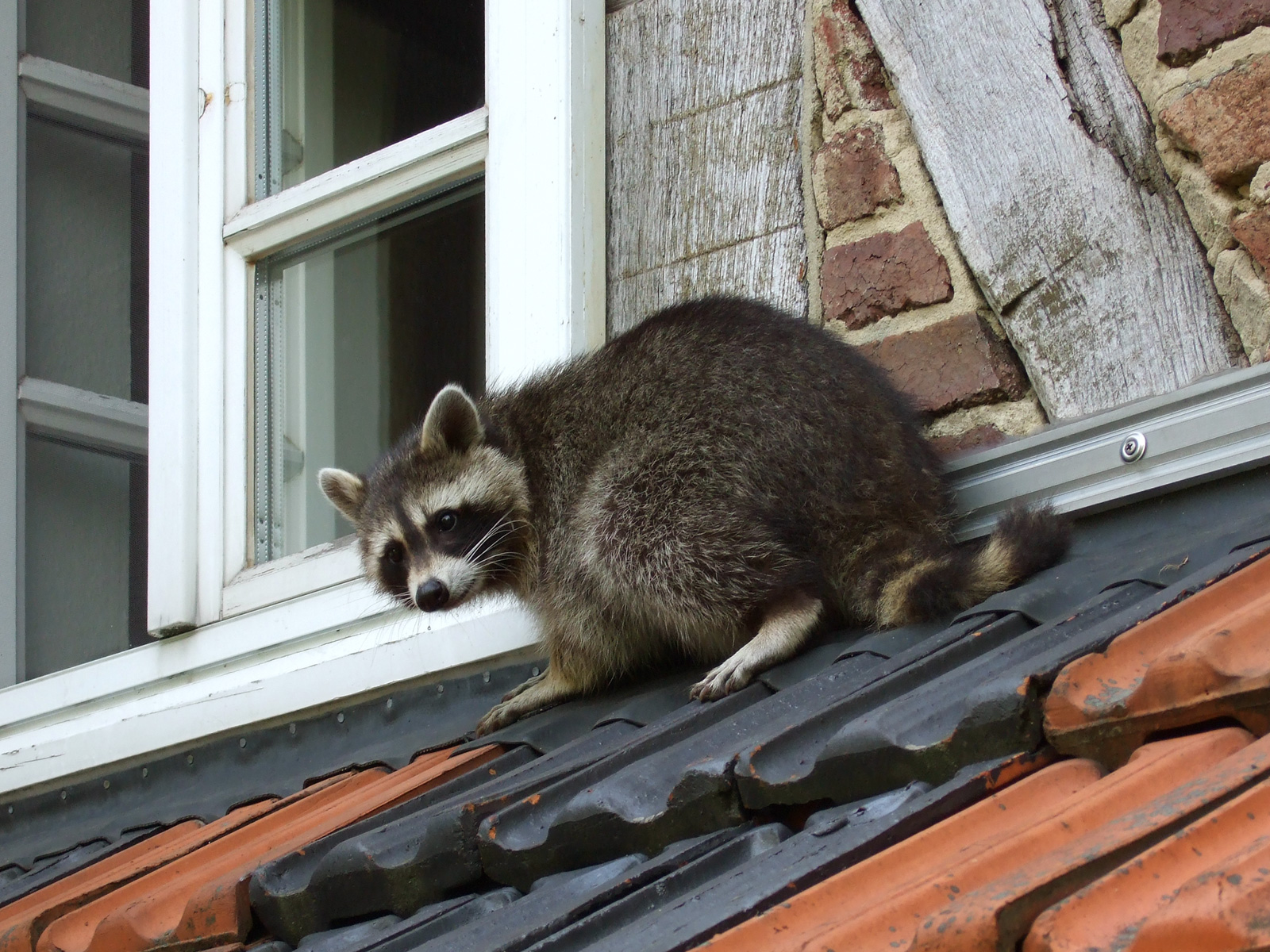
Raccoon on a roof.

== Control methods ==
=== Exclusion ===
Exclusion techniques involve erecting a physical barrier over or around an area where wildlife entry is undesired. In a residential setting, this may include sealing a crawlspace, attic, gable vents, or chimney to prevent incursions from rodents (squirrels, rats, mice) and bats. Various sealants may be used depending on the location needing sealed, though steel wool, hardware cloth, and other materials which cannot easily be chewed through are favored.

In agricultural settings, netting is often placed over crops to exclude birds. Larger mammals can be excluded with fencing, though the exclusion of multiple species may require several layers of fencing. To thoroughly exclude white-tailed deer, fencing may need to be at least 2.4 metres (7.9 ft) high. Fences covering large areas may interfere with the natural movement of wildlife and fragment habitats.

=== Habitat modification ===
Habitat modification involves removing easy access to high quality food, water, or shelter from an area to make it less desirable to wildlife. While this method reduces the presence of nuisance wildlife, it may also impact populations of non-target species.

Some common methods of habitat modification include mowing grass, removal of woody debris, or covering open water.

=== Chemical repellents ===
Using a repellent that changes the behavior of an animal may lead to a reduction or elimination of damage. Several available repellents, such as bad-tasting coatings or odor repellents may deter wildlife from feeding on plants. Tactile repellents (e.g., slightly sticky residue) may discourage bird roosting. Other non-lethal chemical repellents include using predator urine, irritants of the mucous membranes, or chemicals which cause gastrointestinal irritation. Generally, non-toxic repellents are short-lasting at best and completely ineffective at worst for deterring vertebrate nuisance wildlife.

=== Trapping ===
- Live trapping: Live trapping a nuisance animal may be a preferred solution in cases where the animal is not expected to return following a relocation. Cage or box traps, leghold traps, rocket nets, and walk-in traps all may be used for live trapping.
- Lethal traps: several traps exist which are designed to trap and quickly kill target species. These include snap traps for rodents or body-grip traps for beavers, muskrats, and other meso-mammals.
- Glue traps

Glue traps and boards can be lethal or non-lethal methods of control used to trap small mammals and reptiles. Applying vegetable oil will dissolve the glue, theoretically allowing for release, but nearly half of lizards caught using "non-lethal" glue boards in one study died. Glue boards are often used to remove rodents, but are associated with some of the most severe welfare impacts of all rodent trapping methods.

=== Hazing devices ===
Hazing devices are designed to scare animals away from an area or to deter their presence by making the area seem dangerous. Hazing may use auditory stimuli such as loud, sudden noises using bangers and screamers, or playback of conspecific alarm calls. Visual stimuli are also used, such as effigies (i.e., hanging a carcass of the target species), lasers, or reflective devices which move in the wind. Often, nuisance animals become accustomed to these tactics, requiring regular reinforcement or changes to hazing methodology.

== See also ==
- Animal trapping
- Culling
- Electrical disruptions caused by squirrels
- Emu War
- Goose egg addling
- List of government animal eradication programs
- Pest control
- Tree squirrel
- Wildlife management
