= Franklin Ware Mann =

American inventor

Franklin Weston Mann
- Born: 24 July 1856; Norfolk, Massachusetts
- Died: 14 November 1916 (aged 60); Milford, Massachusetts
- Education: Cornell University; Boston University School of Medicine
- Scientific career
- Fields: ballistics

Franklin Weston Mann (July 24, 1856 – November 14, 1916) was an American physician and inventor remembered as the author of the pioneering ballistics text entitled The Bullet's Flight from Powder to Target: The Internal and External Ballistics of Small Arms; a Study of Rifle Shooting with the Personal Element Excluded, Disclosing the Cause of the Error at Target.

== Early life ==
Mann was the youngest of six children born in Norfolk, Massachusetts to Levi and Lydia (Ware) Mann. He grew up on a New England farm and started shooting at the age of twelve. He was intrigued by the causes of dispersion of bullets fired at a single point of aim. He graduated from Cornell University with a Bachelor of Science degree in 1878 and from Boston University School of Medicine as a Doctor of Medicine. He worked four years as a general practitioner including obstetrics while running a shop where he sharpened knives and lawnmowers and invented in 1889 a machine for chopping slaughterhouse bones into bone meal for chicken feed. He manufactured and sold the Mann Bone Cutter from a factory in Milford, Massachusetts. Revenue from the sale of his bone cutters enabled him to retire from practicing medicine at the age of 37 and devote his time to the investigation of rifle ballistics.

== Experimentation ==
Mann worked with members of the Massachusetts Rifle Association including gunsmith Adolph Otto Niedner and gun barrel-maker Harry Melville Pope. By 1894 he was conducting experiments with the aid of precision-crafted guns and ammunition on specially designed equipment to minimize and measure sources of error. On his family farm, he constructed a massive concrete foundation to anchor machines holding rifle barrels as motionless as possible. In front of the foundation, he built a 200-yard (180 m) range where bullets could be fired through a cloth tunnel to prevent wind disturbance. Stations within the tunnel held sheets of paper to measure bullet orientation and deflection at intervals.

== Legacy ==
The results of his investigations published in 1909 are commonly known as The Bullet's Flight. The precision-machined vee-shaped cast-iron steadying cradle he invented for his investigations was adopted in 1920 by the National Institute of Standards and Technology and Aberdeen Proving Ground, and has been widely replicated for ballistics investigation as a "Mann Rest". His 1909 publication had secretly been studied by European combatants building long-range artillery of World War I. Mann died at home in 1916 without being aware of the international governmental recognition of his work.
