= .22 caliber =

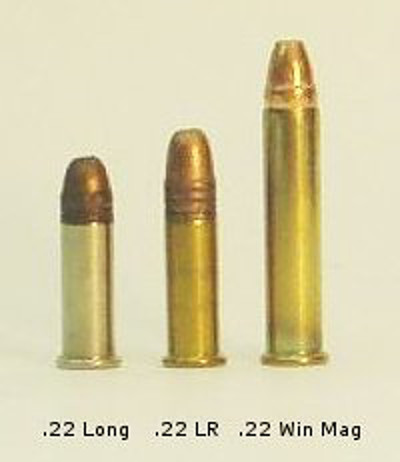

.22 caliber, or 5.6 mm, refers to a common firearms bore diameter of 0.22 inch (5.6 mm) in both rimfire and centerfire cartridges.

Cartridges in this caliber include the very widely used .22 Long Rifle and .223 Remington/5.56×45mm NATO.

.22 inch is also a popular air gun pellet caliber, second only to the ubiquitous .177 caliber.

== Rimfire ==
.22-inch caliber rimfire variations include:

=== In production ===
- .22 Short, a cartridge used mostly in pocket pistols and mini-revolvers, introduced in 1857
- .22 Long, a cartridge using the same bullet as .22 short but a longer casing, introduced in 1871
- .22 Long Rifle (LR), the most common cartridge type of this caliber, often referred to simply as ".22 caliber" or "22"
- .22 Stinger, a variant of .22 LR with a slightly longer casing but identical overall cartridge dimensions (see CCI Stinger)
- .22 Winchester Magnum Rimfire (WMR), a magnum cartridge that is longer and more powerful than the .22 LR
- .22 Winchester Rimfire (WRF), a cartridge originally introduced to provide higher velocity than the .22 LR

=== Obsolete ===
- .22 Extra Long, a cartridge designed in 1880, not offered commercially since 1935
- .22 ILARCO, a cartridge designed in 1987, specific to the American-180 submachine gun
- .22 Remington Automatic, a cartridge specific to the Remington Model 16 semi-automatic rifle, not offered commercially since 1928
- .22 Winchester Automatic, a cartridge specific to the Winchester Model 1903 semi-automatic rifle, not offered commercially since 1932

=== Special-use ===
- .22 BB (bulleted breech), a low-velocity cartridge with a case shorter than the .22 short
- .22 CB (conical bullet), a low-velocity cartridge with a case shorter than the .22 short
- Quiet-22 (40 Grain lead projectile), a low-velocity cartridge with the same case as the .22 LR

== Centerfire ==
.22-inch caliber centerfire cartridges include:

=== Metric ===
- 5.56×30mm MINSAS, a cartridge for close-quarter battle use
- 5.56×45mm NATO, an intermediate cartridge widely used in AR-15 style rifles
- 5.7×28mm, a cartridge manufactured by FN Herstal

=== .22 ===
- .22 Accelerator, a special loading of the .30-30 Winchester, .308 Winchester, and .30-06 Springfield cartridges that are manufactured by Remington
- .22 ARC
- .22 BR Remington, a wildcat cartridge commonly used in varmint hunting and benchrest shooting
- .22 CHeetah, a cartridge based on the Remington 308 BR, modified to .22 caliber
- .22 Creedmoor
- .22 Eargesplitten Loudenboomer, a wildcat cartridge based on a .378 Weatherby Magnum case intended to deliver high muzzle velocity
- .22 Hornet (5.6×36mmR), a cartridge variant introduced in 1930, primarily used for small game and varmint hunting.
- .22 Nosler, a cartridge introduced in 2017 intended for use in AR-15-style rifles
- .22 PPC, a firearm cartridge used primarily in benchrest shooting
- .22 Remington Jet, a cartridge designed for the Smith & Wesson Model 53 revolver
- .22 Savage Hi-Power (5.6×52mmR), a cartridge introduced by Savage in 1912 for use in the Savage Model 99 rifle
- .22 TCM (22 Micro-Mag), a shortened .223 Remington case designed to load into standard 9mm pistol magazines
- .22 Winchester Centerfire (WCF), a cartridge introduced in 1885 for use in a Winchester single-shot rifle
- .22-250 Remington, a very high velocity cartridge

=== .218 ===
- .218 Bee, a cartridge powered between .22 Hornet and .221 Remington Fireball

=== .220 ===
- .220 Rook (.220 Long Centrefire), an obsolete British cartridge of the 1880s
- .220 Russian (5.6×39mm), a 7.62×39mm cartridge necked down to hold a 5.6 mm bullet
- .220 Swift (5.56×56mmSR), the first cartridge (1935) with a muzzle velocity of over 4,000 ft/s (1,200 m/s)

=== .221 ===
- .221 Remington Fireball, a special cartridge for use in the experimental Remington XP-100 pistol (1963)

=== .222 ===
- .222 Remington, the first commercial rimless .22 (5.56 mm) cartridge made in the United States (1950)
- .222 Remington Magnum, a short-lived commercially produced cartridge derived from the .222 Remington
- .222 rimmed, an Australian cartridge of the 1960s for single-shot rifles

=== .223 ===
- .223 Remington, a commercial cartridge developed for the ArmaLite AR-15, from which the 5.56×45mm NATO cartridge was derived
- .223 Winchester Super Short Magnum (WSSM, 5.56×42mm), a cartridge based on the Winchester Short Magnum case

=== .224 ===
- .22 Spitfire (5.7mm Johnson, originally MMJ 5.7), a cartridge introduced in 1963 for .224 cal. re-barreled or lined US 30 Carbines
- .224 Weatherby Magnum (5.56×49mmB), a cartridge developed in 1963 for use in the Weatherby Varmintmaster rifle
- .224 Boz, a cartridge developed in the late 1990s, intended to defeat body armor
- .224 Valkyrie (5.6×41mm), a cartridge similar to the 5.56×45mm NATO, with a shorter case length
- .224-32 FA, a cartridge designed in 2009 for use in the Freedom Arms Model 97 revolver

=== .225 ===
- .225 Winchester, a replacement for the .220 Swift cartridge, introduced in 1964

== See also ==
- .223 Wylde chamber, a hybrid rifle chamber designed to allow .22 caliber barrels to safely fire either .223 Remington or 5.56×45mm NATO
- 5 mm caliber
- 22 (number)
- Snake shot
- 22 (disambiguation)
