= ArmaLite AR-7 =

AR-7
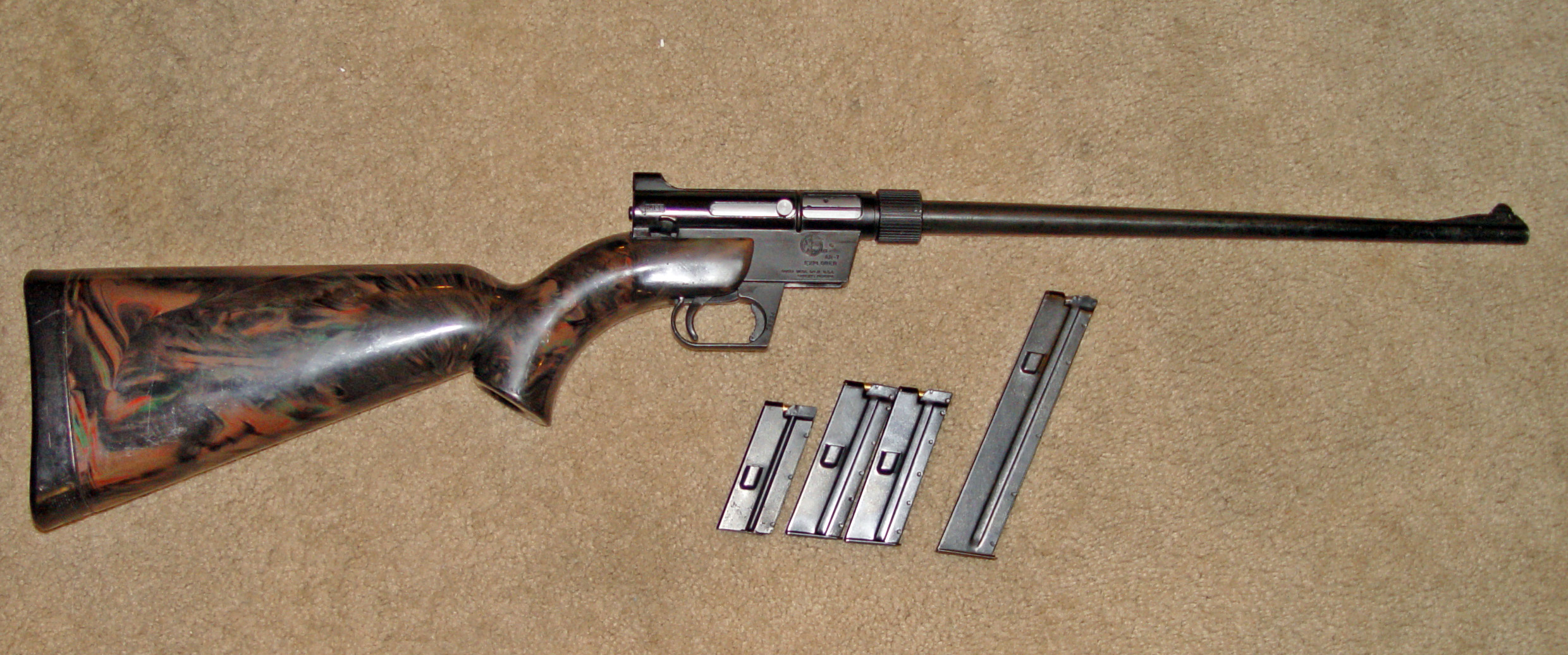
- ArmaLite AR-7 survival rifle with 8-, 10-, and 15-round magazines
- Type: Survival rifle
- Place of origin: United States

Service history
- In service: 1959–present

Production history
- Designer: Eugene Stoner
- Designed: 1958
- Variants: ArmaLite AR-7 Explorer; Charter Arms AR-7 Explorer; Charter Arms Explorer II Pistol; Israeli Pilot's Survival Rifle; Henry U.S. Survival .22

Specifications
- Mass: 2.5 lb (1.1 kg)
- Length: 35 in (889 mm)
- Barrel length: 16 in (406 mm)
- Cartridge: .22 Long Rifle
- Action: Straight blowback-operated
- Rate of fire: Semi-automatic
- Muzzle velocity: 1,080 ft/s (329 m/s) to 1,280 ft/s (390 m/s) (varies by type of .22 Long Rifle cartridge)
- Effective firing range: 109 yd (100 m)
- Feed system: Standard 8-round magazine. 5-, 10-, 15-, 25-round magazines available.
- Sights: Aperture rear and drift-adjustable front.

The ArmaLite AR-7 Explorer is a semi-automatic firearm in .22 Long Rifle caliber, developed in 1959 from the AR-5 that was adopted by the U.S. Air Force as a pilot and aircrew survival weapon. The AR-7 was adopted and modified by the Israeli Air Force as an aircrew survival weapon in the 1980s.

The AR-7 was designed by American firearms designer Eugene Stoner, who is most associated with the development of the ArmaLite AR-15 rifle that was adopted by the US military as the M16. The civilian AR-7's intended markets today are backpackers and other recreational users as a takedown utility rifle. The AR-7 is intended for users of recreational vehicles (automobile, airplane, or boat) who might need a weapon for foraging or defense in a wilderness emergency.

== History and design ==
The prototype of what would become the AR-7 was designed by Eugene Stoner at ArmaLite Inc., a division of Fairchild Aircraft. The rifle shares some of the features of the bolt-action AR-5, another takedown rifle designed by Stoner for ArmaLite and adopted by the United States Air Force in 1956 as the MA-1. The MA-1 was intended to replace the M4 Survival Rifle and the M6 Aircrew Survival Weapon which was a superposed ("over-under") twin-barrel rifle/shotgun chambered in .22 Hornet and .410 bore, using a break-open action. The AR-5 had the advantage of repeat fire over the then-standard M6, using the same .22 Hornet cartridge. When the AR-5 was adopted as the MA-1 but was not placed in issue due to the number of usable M4 and M6 survival weapons in USAF inventory, ArmaLite used the research and tooling for the AR-5 in developing the AR-7 for the civilian market.

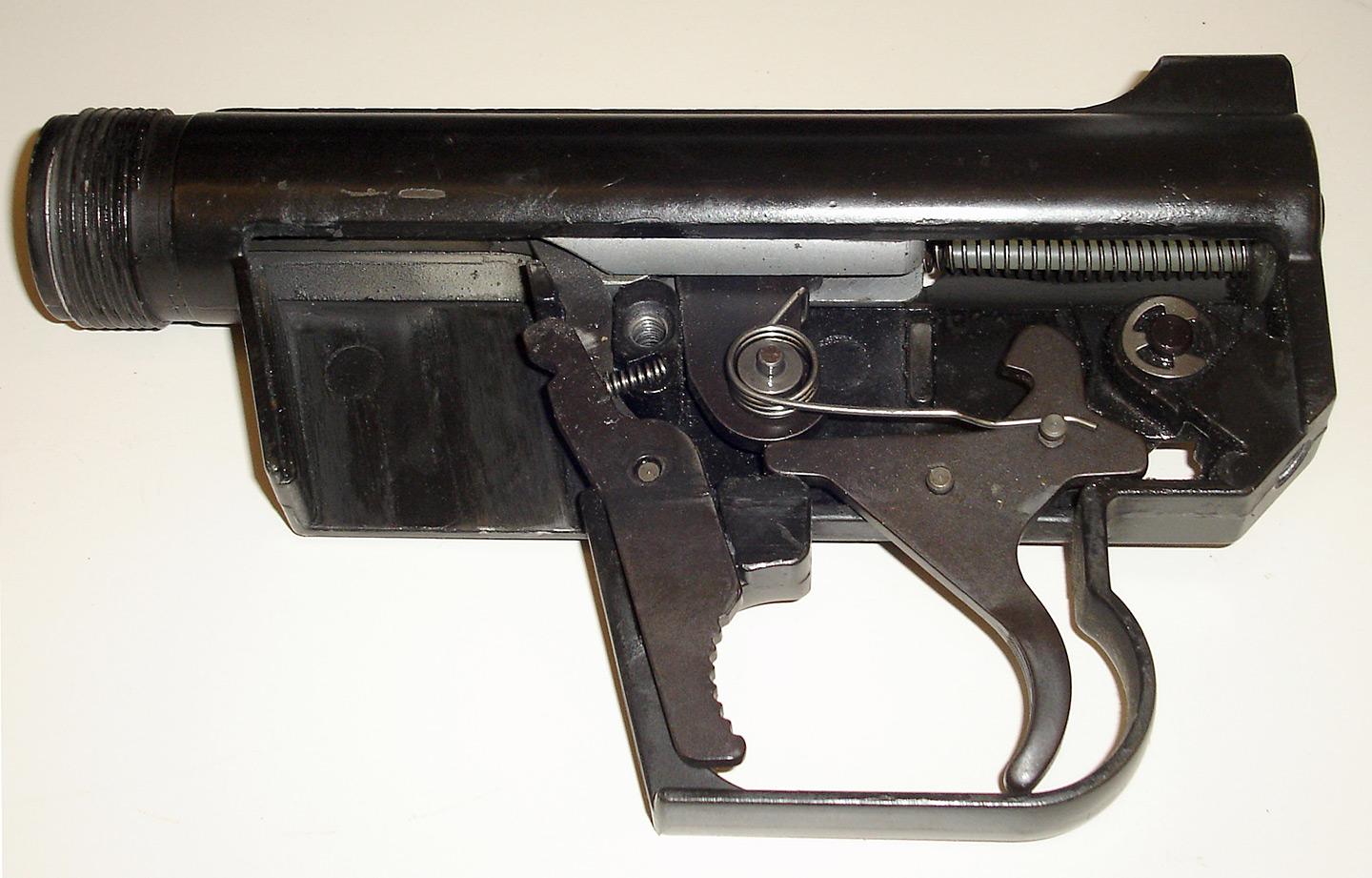
ArmaLite AR-7 Explorer internal parts assembled (left sideplate removed)

The AR-7 uses a blowback semi-automatic action in .22 Long Rifle but retains the AR-5/MA-1 feature of storing the disassembled parts within the hollow stock, which is filled with plastic foam and capable of floating. Like the bolt-action AR-5, the AR-7 was designed as a survival rifle for foraging small game for food. The AR-7 is constructed primarily of aluminum, with plastic for the stock, buttcap, and recoil spring guide. The bolt is steel. The original barrel was aluminum using a rifled steel liner; barrels of some production models have used all steel barrels, others have used barrels made of composite materials. The AR-7 measures 35 inches (89 cm) overall when assembled. It disassembles to four sections (barrel, action, stock, and magazine), with three parts storing inside the plastic stock, measuring 16 inches (41 cm) long. The rifle weighs 2.5 pounds (1.1 kg), light enough for convenient backpacking. The rear sight is a peep sight, which comes on a flat metal blade with an aperture (in later production two different size apertures available by removing and flipping the rear sight), and is adjustable for elevation (up-down). The front sight is adjustable for windage (side-to-side). Accuracy is sufficient for hunting small game at ranges to 50 yards (46 m).

=== Performance ===
Reliability of the AR-7 is highly dependent on the condition of the magazine and on the ammunition used, perhaps more so than with other models of semi-automatic .22 caliber rifles. The feed ramp is part of the magazine and is subject to damage from mishandling. Flat-nosed bullets tend to jam on the edge of the chamber of the barrel. The transition of the cartridge from magazine to barrel can be smoothed by minor beveling of the chamber of the barrel, by using round-nosed as opposed to flat-nosed bullets, and by paying attention to the condition of the feed lips and feed ramp of the magazine. Later production magazines include an external wire spring to align the cartridge; earlier magazines used two pinch marks at the top of the magazine body, which in use could become sprung open or worn.

All iterations of the AR-7 from the ArmaLite to the Henry U.S. Survival rifle use a bolt and dual recoil springs that are heavy compared to most other .22 semiautomatics. The AR-7 requires high-velocity ammunition for reliable functioning. The manufacturers recommend use of 40-grain (2.6 g) round nose bullets in high-velocity loadings. It is possible to manually load a single round into the firing chamber, allowing use of flat-nosed bullets or low-velocity or subsonic ammunition.

The barrel takedown nut tends to loosen during firing and may need hand-tightening to maintain both accuracy and reliability.

ArmaLite sold the design to Charter Arms in 1973. According to some accounts posted by enthusiasts, this is when quality began to deteriorate. Barrels were said to have a tendency to warp. Other sources state that the first production at Charter had problems which were corrected in later production runs.

=== Production history ===
(Summary of information available in The Blue Book of Gun Values)

- 1959-1973: ArmaLite
- 1973-1990: Charter Arms
- 1990-1997: Survival Arms - Cocoa, Florida
- 1998-2004: AR-7 Industries - LLC, Meriden, Connecticut (bought by ArmaLite in 2004)
- 1997–2007: Henry Repeating Arms Co. - Brooklyn, New York
- 2007–present: Henry Repeating Arms Co. - Bayonne, New Jersey

== AR-7 variants ==
=== ArmaLite AR-7 Explorer ===
Original ArmaLite barrels had a steel liner in an aluminum shell. The stock was a foam filled plastic shell with internal recesses for the receiver, barrel and one magazine and did not accept the receiver with a magazine in place. The original ArmaLite stock retained buoyancy longer than some later stocks by other makers. The receiver did not provide for a scope mount. The rear sight was a peep aperture, adjustable for elevation. The front sight was drift-adjustable for windage.

=== Argentine variant ===
The AR-7 was also manufactured in Argentina as the Sistema de Armas .22 LR Fire de Brenta. It came with various barrel lengths, shrouds and fixed rifle stocks as well as pistol grips with retractable stocks.

=== Herter's Outdoor Supply ===
Herter's, Hy Hunter and American International Distributors marketed .22 replicas of the Broomhandle Mauser (as "Bolomauser"), Thompson submachine gun (as "T-62 Civilian Defense Model") and M1 Carbine made on AR-7 receivers and barrels.

=== Charter Arms AR-7 Explorer ===
The Charter Arms AR-7 Explorer rifle replicated the ArmaLite AR-7 Explorer with variations in finish.

=== Charter Arms Explorer II pistol ===
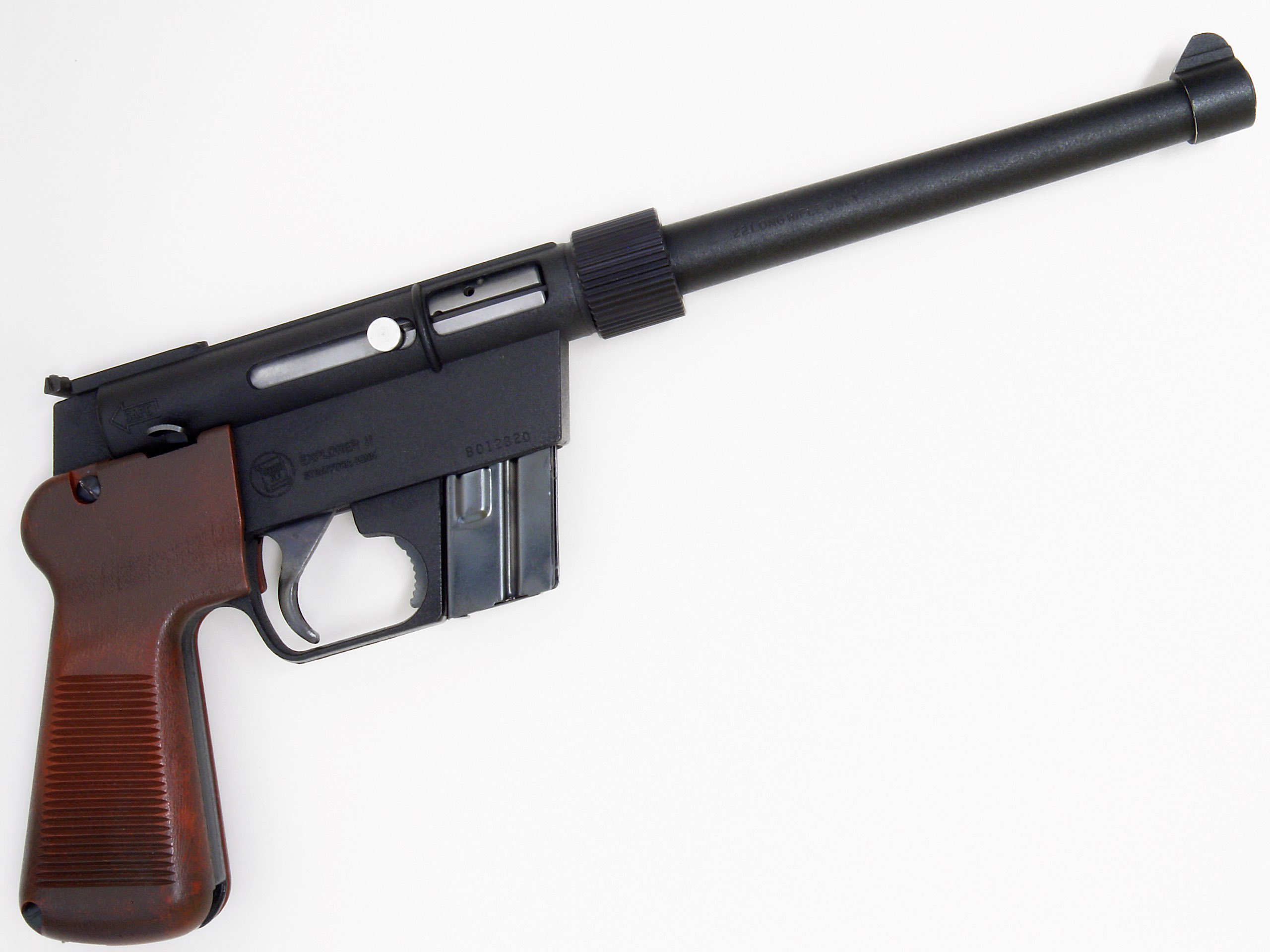
Explorer II pistol with 8 inch barrel

Explorer II was a pistol version of the AR-7. It resembled a Broomhandle Mauser. The receiver had a built-in pistol grip with no provision for the rifle stock (the internal parts are interchangeable between rifle and pistol). The rear sight of the pistol was an open notch adjustable for windage and elevation. The Explorer II front sight was integral with the barrel shell and was not adjustable. The magazine well in front of the trigger guard would accept any magazine designed for the rifle. A spare 8-round magazine could be carried inside the grip. The most common barrel was six inches (150 mm). Optional barrel lengths included eight inches (200 mm) and ten inches (250 mm).

==== Legal note ====
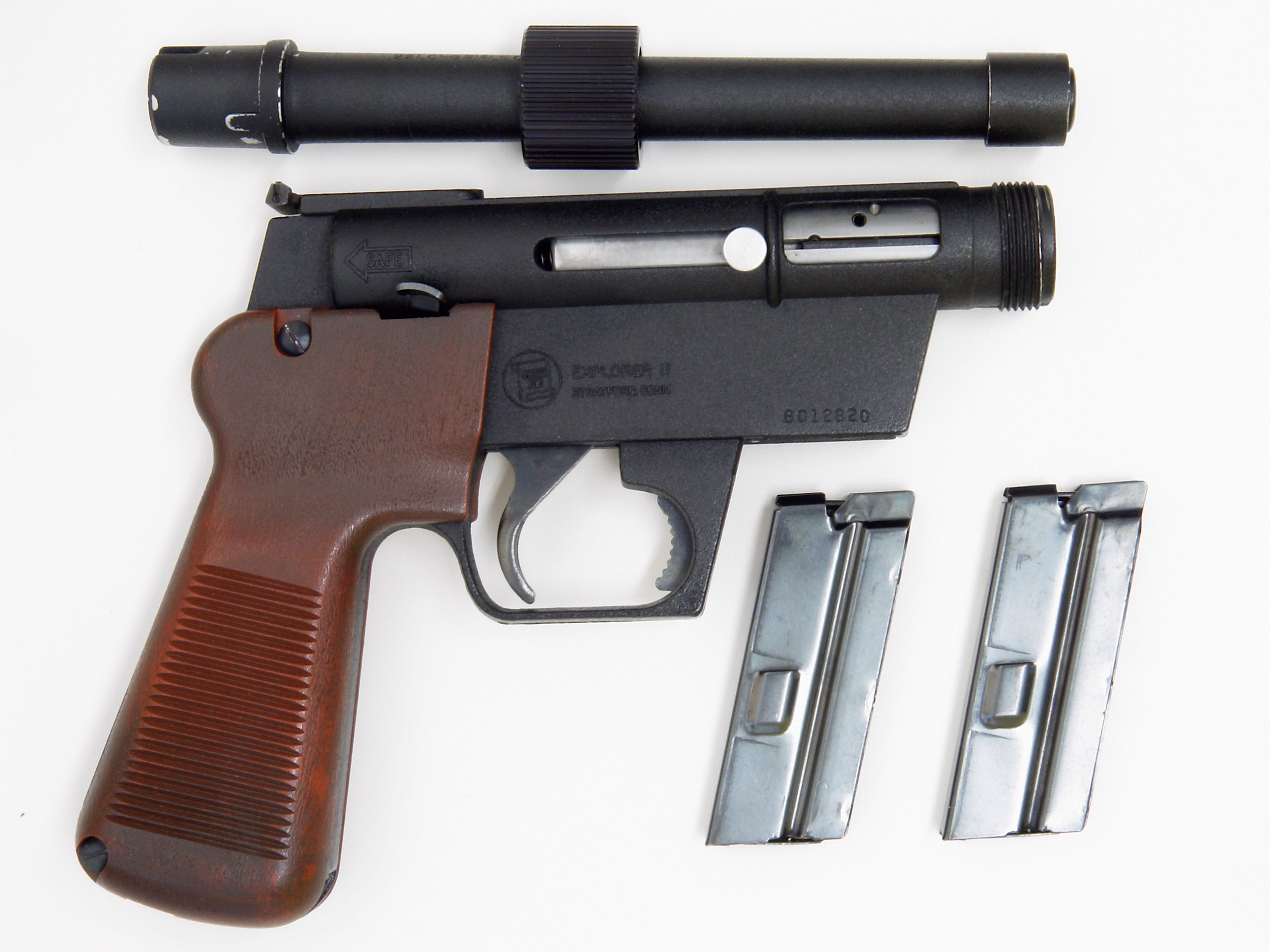
Alignment lug is on barrel underside

Because the U.S. 1934 NFA regulations set the minimum rifle barrel length at 16 inches (410 mm), Charter Arms made the barrels of the Explorer I rifle and Explorer II pistol non-interchangeable to prevent installing the pistol barrel on the rifle. The AR-7 barrel has an alignment lug that mates a notch in the receiver. The rifle receiver notch and barrel lug are on top; the pistol notch and lug are broader and on the bottom. If a Charter Arms factory-made pistol barrel were installed on a rifle, the extractor on the bolt would be opposite the extractor slot in the barrel, preventing the bolt from closing (plus the front sight would be upside down). Modifying the pistol barrel to fit the rifle, or modifying the rifle receiver to accept the pistol barrel, would be "making a short barrel rifle" legally requiring federal registration on an ATF Form 1.

Conversely, after the Supreme Court ruling in United States v. Thompson/Center Arms Co., modifying the pistol to accept the rifle barrel and/or stock, or modifying the rifle barrel or stock to fit the pistol is legal so long as you do not have the rifle stock attached at the same time as the pistol barrel. It is legal (as a pistol) to have the rifle barrel attached with the pistol grip; there is no federal maximum pistol barrel length.

In the United Kingdom this rifle is a Section 1 Firearm requiring a Firearms Certificate to buy or acquire.

=== AR-7 Industries ===
AR-7 Industries made solid steel barrels much heavier than the AR-7 barrels by ArmaLite, Charter or Henry. There was also a U.S. survival variant.

=== Henry U.S. Survival Rifle ===
In 1980, the design and production rights passed on to Henry Repeating Arms and the compact rifle was slightly revised, resulting in improved reliability and durability. An ABS material replaced the original stock plastic, which was prone to cracking and failure. The receiver recess in the stock of the first Henry version allowed storage of the receiver with a magazine in place and the rifle was normally sold with two magazines.

The later version of the Henry allows for storage of three magazines total, with two in the stock recess, and one in the receiver. The modern Henry U.S. Survival Rifle floats on water for a while either assembled or stored, although it is not entirely waterproof and will sink eventually. The rifles now include a full Teflon coating on the outer surface. Henry added a 3/8 inch (9.5 mm) Dovetail rail (aka Weaver .22 Tip-Off Mount rail) on the top of the receiver for attaching a wide variety of optics. Henry introduced a 5-round magazine for jurisdictions that limit magazine capacity while hunting wild game.

=== Israeli pilot's survival rifle ===
Another variant was made by ArmaLite and sold to the Israeli Military for use as pilot/aircrew survival weapons, replacing the 9mm Beretta 1951 8-shot handgun. The Israelis further modified these rifles, adding a telescoping stock, a pistol grip from a FAL-type rifle, shortening the barrel (to 13.5 inches (340 mm)), and adding a front sight based on the K98k Mauser. The shoulder stock held two magazines, with a third magazine in the receiver, plus forty rounds of ammunition stored inside the pistol grip. After Israeli service, some of these rifles were re-imported into the U.S. by Bricklee Trading Company for sale on the civilian market. The barrels are marked with the BTC identification as required by U.S. law on imported guns. The Israeli version commands a premium among collectors. In order to comply with U.S. Federal law on minimum rifle barrel length of 16", a 3-inch muzzle brake was permanently attached.

== Operation ==
The AR-7 functions as a simple blowback semi-automatic. The AR-7 is a light firearm with a heavy bolt and twin recoil springs.

== Aftermarket modifications ==
The fact that both the barrel and stock are detachable has led to a plethora of after-market accessories, similar to those available for the Ruger 10/22. Barrels, stocks, and grips, of varying finishes and utility, can be added to the rifle. These include collapsible stocks, wire-framed stocks, pistol grips, flash suppressors, shrouded barrels, high-capacity magazines, telescopic sights, reflex 'red dot' sights and other occasionally fanciful-looking hardware, some at a cost greater than the rifle itself. Such accessories often make it impossible to use the original floating stock for storage of modified parts.

The current Henry U.S. Survival AR-7 has a 3/8" scope sight rail integral with the receiver to accept standard Weaver-style "Tip-Off" rings. For earlier makes, B Square supplied the Charter Arms AR-7 Explorer Scope Mount Base, an accessory bracket with a 3/8" rail. The base attached by the receiver side plate screw (the Charter Arms side plate screw is longer than that of the ArmaLite). This base can be used on the ArmaLite and the Charter Arms Explorer rifles and the Charter Arms Explorer II pistol. However, with the base in place, the rifle receiver will no longer fit the recess in the stock for storage. (The B Square Charter Arms AR-7 base is not needed on the Henry version and will not fit the Henry receiver.)

Apart from the highly modified AR-7 Israeli survival rifles, most AR-7 models lack provision for a carry sling. AR-7 owners have adapted slings designed for use on guns without modification, such as universal shotgun slings designed to cup the shotgun buttstock at the rear and clamp to the barrel or magazine tube at the front. Given the light weight of the AR-7, 2.5 pounds, a proper length of parachute cord with a slip knot at either end can be used as a sling or lanyard.

== See also ==
- List of ArmaLite rifles
- Preetz Model 65
- Marlin Model 70P
