= AR 5 =

AR5, AR 5, or AR-5 can refer to:

- ArmaLite AR-5, a .22 caliber bolt-action aircrew survival rifle
- Arkansas Highway 5, a designation for three state highways in Arkansas
- Arkansas's 5th congressional district, an obsolete district
- IPCC Fifth Assessment Report, a 2014 synthesis report produced by the Intergovernmental Panel on Climate Change
- USS Vulcan (AR-5), a US Navy repair ship
