= MGV-176 =

- Type: Submachine gun
- Place of origin: Slovenia

Service history
- Used by: See Users
- Wars: Ten Day War; Croatian War of Independence; Bosnian War

Production history
- Manufacturer: Orbis

Specifications
- Mass: 1,810 g (3.99 lb) empty; 3,400 g (7.5 lb) loaded
- Length: 795 mm (31.3 in) (stock unfolded); 480 mm (19 in) (stock folded)
- Barrel length: 260 mm (10 in)
- Cartridge: .22 Long Rifle
- Action: blowback, open bolt
- Rate of fire: 1200-1600 round/min
- Feed system: 161 round detachable pan magazine
- Sights: Fixed open sights

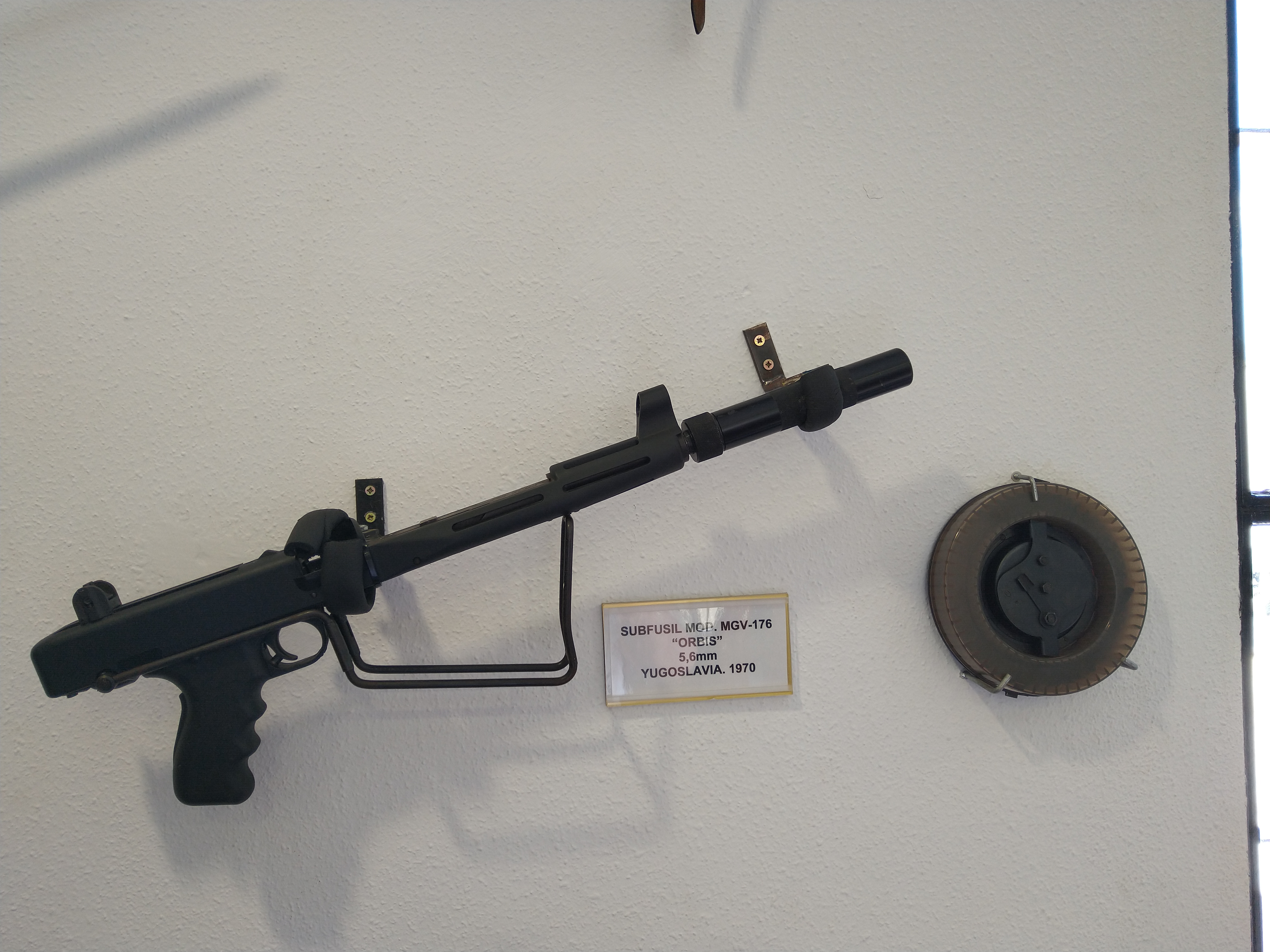

The MGV-176 is a submachine gun chambered for the .22 Long Rifle cartridge. It is a modernized version of the American-180.

It was manufactured in Yugoslavia by Gorenje from Velenje until 1979. Production continued in Slovenia where it is apparently still manufactured by Orbis.

== Overview ==
The concept of this weapon is to overcome the deficiencies of the low power rimfire cartridge by rapidly delivering a large number of projectiles. The weapon, therefore, relies on the .22 Long Rifle's very low recoil and a high rate of fire of 1,200-1,600 RPM. It utilized a pan magazine mounted above the barrel, with a capacity of 161 rounds.

The .22 Long Rifle is one of the cheapest and most easily obtainable rifle cartridges in the world, which leads this type of firearm to be popular with some gun owners in localities with laws restricting the ownership of fully automatic weapons.

== Operational history ==
MGV-176 was widely used both during the Slovenian war of independence by Slovenian territorial defense militia then by Croat volunteers during the first part of the Croatian War of Independence, notably during the so-called Battle of the Barracks.

It was however replaced as soon as a regular Croatian army was established and equipped with standard military weapons.

== Users ==
- Croatia
- Slovenia: Including the Slovenian police.

== See also ==
- American-180 submachine gun, also chambered in .22 Long Rifle or .22 ILARCO and utilizing a high-capacity pan magazine.
