= Preetz Model 65 =

- Type: Carbine
- Place of origin: West Germany

Production history
- Designer: Josef G. Landmann
- Designed: 1965
- Produced: 1965-1975

Specifications
- Cartridge: .22LR (some models in .22 WMR)
- Action: Blowback
- Feed system: 5 and 10 round detachable box magazine

The Preetz Model 65 is a blowback action, semi-automatic .22LR caliber survival rifle made in several models by Josef G. Landmann of Holstein or Preetz, West Germany, also listed as J.G.L. or JGL 65, 68 and 69 in some references. It was intended as a rival to the Armalite AR-7. A .22 Magnum version identified by a tubular extension to the receiver was also made. An article on Guns.com has suggested that the Model 65 is actually a clone of the AR-7. This claim is supported by allegations on some firearms forums that with a little work, many of the internal parts are interchangeable between the two.

== Design ==
The JGL Preetz Automat Model 65 was manufactured in West Germany. The receiver is made of zamac, a zinc-aluminum alloy. Like the AR-7, the barrel is retained by a hand tightened nut and is removable. Unlike the AR-7, it has a flat sided receiver and it was not intended to disassemble to pack into its own buttstock. It was offered in different barrel lengths with various handguards, stocks and pistol grips. It was offered in a conventional sporting rifle version and in variations that replicated the appearance of military arms such as the C96 Broomhandle Mauser, M1 Carbine and M1A1 Thompson submachine gun.

Based on completed auction listings showing serial numbers, total production was in excess of 39,000 Model 65s of all types. There was a brief interruption in production in 1970 because of a West German law (later repealed) forbidding the production of civilian firearms that resembled military guns following the usage by the left-wing militant group Red Army Faction.

== Use outside West Germany ==
=== Australia ===
The Model 65 has been banned for sale or ownership in Australia for two reasons. First, because it can be configured to resemble a Thompson submachine gun, which is banned under Australian law. Second, because it has been said its action can be modified to fire in full automatic mode.

=== Canada ===
Some Model 65s were imported to Canada as light sporting rifles in the late 1960s.

=== Netherlands ===
Model 65s were used by South Moluccan militants during the 1977 Dutch train hijacking. Hostage-taker Hansina Uktolseja, who was shot during the Dutch Marine rescue attempt was famously photographed carrying a Model 65.

=== Northern Ireland ===
Model 65s were smuggled in by the Irish Republican Army in 1974. It has been alleged that they modified these carbines so they would fire full-auto.

=== Philippines ===
The Philippines Constabulary is said to have purchased a quantity of Model 65s for use by its officers in the late 1960s.
