= Quiet-22 =

Firearm cartridge

The Quiet-22 is a .22 caliber round produced by CCI. It has a significantly quieter noise profile compared to most gunshots, generating 75% or less perceived noise than a normal .22. When used with a suppressor, the sound made when firing can be reduced further. The Quiet-22 is the same size as a .22 LR round, but has a reduced powder cartridge.
