= .22 Spitfire =

Rifle cartridge

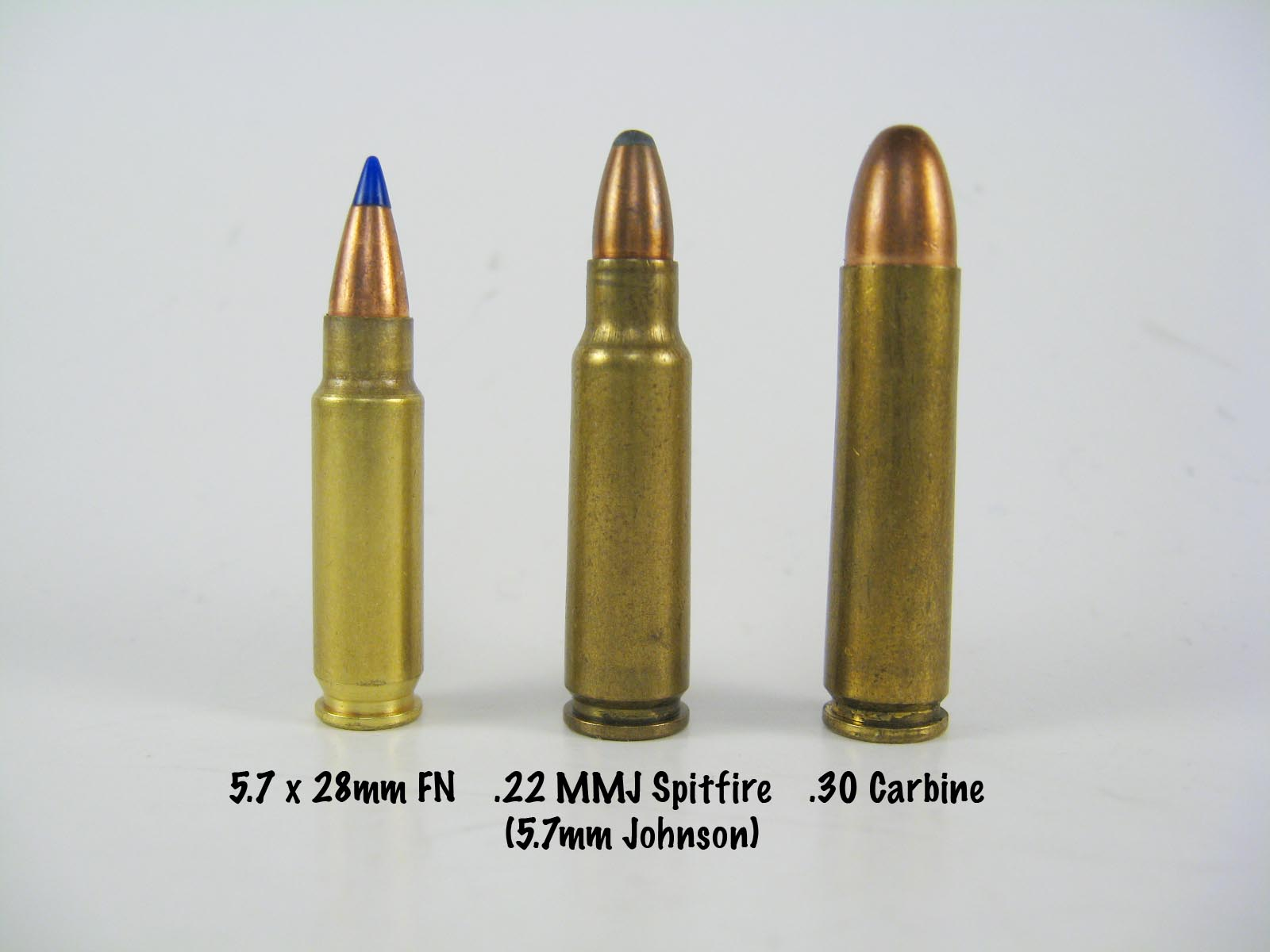
- .22 Spitfire with FN 5.7×28mm and .30 Carbine cartridges
- Type: Rifle
- Place of origin: USA

Production history
- Designer: Melvin M. Johnson
- Designed: 1963
- Manufacturer: Johnson Guns Inc.

Specifications
- Parent case: .30 Carbine
- Bullet diameter: .224 in (5.7 mm)
- Neck diameter: .253 in (6.4 mm)
- Shoulder diameter: .332 in (8.4 mm)
- Base diameter: .353 in (9.0 mm)
- Rim diameter: .356 in (9.0 mm)
- Case length: 1.29 in (33 mm)
- Overall length: 1.65 in (42 mm)
- Rifling twist: 1:14
- Primer type: Boxer small rifle

Ballistic performance
Bullet mass/type	Velocity	Energy
40 gr (3 g)	2,850 ft/s (870 m/s)	720 ft⋅lbf (980 J)
40 gr (3 g)	3,000 ft/s (910 m/s)	795 ft⋅lbf (1,078 J)
50 gr (3 g)	2,700 ft/s (820 m/s)	810 ft⋅lbf (1,100 J)
- Sources: Barnes & Amber

The .22 Spitfire is an American wildcat rifle cartridge developed by Col. Melvin M. Johnson. It was originally named the MMJ 5.7mm by its designer and is also known in the U.S. as the 5.7mm Johnson, the Johnson MMJ 5.7mm Spitfire, and the .22 Johnson, (or 5.7×33mm internationally).

In 1963, Melvin M. Johnson developed a conversion of the M1 Carbine (by either relining or re-barreling the M1 Carbine) to a .224 caliber bore, using bullets commonly used by the ubiquitous .22 Hornet. His cartridge was designed to fit the M1 Carbine and its magazines by starting from the basic form of the .30 Carbine ammunition, keeping the same overall length and case dimensions, necked down to .224 (5.7mm) caliber.

Originally designed with a 1-in-14 twist barrel, the 40 grain .22 Hornet bullet was the standard load. It could also be loaded with lighter or heavier-weight bullets available at that time for the .22 Hornet as well as most bullet weights up to 50 grains such as that used by the .222 Remington (5.7×43mm). The conversion is essentially a .22 caliber (5.7mm) barrel fitted to an M1 Carbine receiver with an appropriate feed ramp for the caliber brazed or welded into the receiver. Some commercial production M1 Carbines were originally manufactured in this caliber with an integral feed ramp for the 5.7 MMJ. Those advertised for sale by Johnson's company were generally named "The Johnson Spitfire Rifle". Ballistic Performance is compared to .22 Hornet because Johnson originally based his 5.7 MMJ on the very similar capacity of the rimmed .22 Hornet, but fashioned in a rimless cartridge design appropriate for a self-loading carbine with very light recoil while remaining within the M1 Carbine's pressure limitations. Common loadings include 33gr-50gr bullets, with velocities ranging from 2,700 to 3,000 ft/s depending on load. (Note: The 5.7 MMJ is entirely different from the modern FN 5.7x28mm cartridge.) The specifications tend to land the cartridge between the 5.56×45mm NATO and the more recent 5.7x28mm FN.

The original "Spitfire M1 Carbine" was advertised as firing the "5.7 MMJ cartridge", a 40-grain (2.6g) bullet with a muzzle velocity of 3050ft/s (930m/s), though hand loaders with careful selection of modern powders and appropriate bullets consistently safely exceed those numbers while remaining within the M1 30 US Carbine's maximum pressure generally rated at 40,000 psi (or 40,000 CUP) according to SAAMI standards. In comparison, the "standard" load for the .30 Carbine has a .30 Carbine ball bullet weighing 110 grains (7.1 g); a complete loaded round weighs 195 grains (12.6 g) and has a muzzle velocity of 1,990ft/s (610m/s), giving it 967ft⋅lbf (1,311 joules) of energy when fired from the M1 carbine's 18-inch barrel.

Johnson originally tried to interest the US military in the conversion to this cartridge due to the high number of available M1 Carbines still in US Military service and storage, and the relatively low cost to perform the conversion. This was unsuccessful since they were already significantly along in the development of the M16 and its 5.56mm (.223) cartridge, both of which would soon be adopted and deployed. He then advertised conversions for surplus M1 Carbines into the smaller caliber format, and that the modified carbines would perform well as a survival rifle for use in jungles or other remote areas since they provide a package combining relatively light, easy-to-carry ammunition in a light, fast handling carbine with very low recoil.

Johnson's contracted commercially produced parts and assemblies for the M1 Carbine variant were completed as the Johnson Model JSM 5.7mm Spitfire, the Model JSCD, the Model JSSR, the Model 5770, the Model 5771, the Model 5772, or the Model 5773, which were all factory chambered in his "5.7 MMJ" cartridge with the appropriate feed ramps manufactured into those new commercially produced carbines. (The Model 5774 designation was for conversions of carbines originally chambered in 30 Carbine, and included 5.7 MMJ feed ramps added during the conversion process). All of which he generally called his "Spitfire" carbines.

Melvin M. Johnson was also the designer of the M1941 Johnson Rifle and the M1941 Johnson Machine Gun.

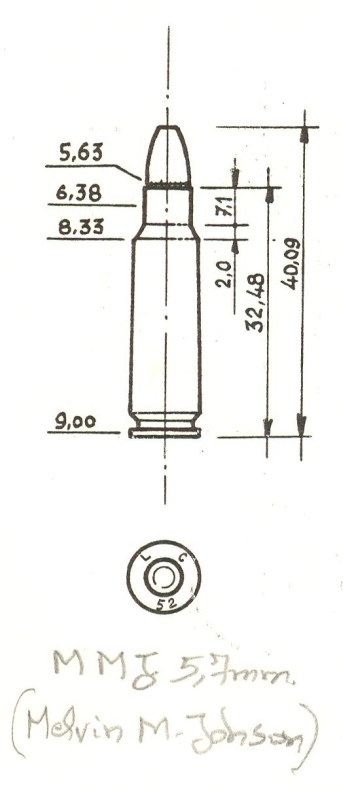
Dimensional Line Drawing

== See also ==
- .22 Hornet
- .22 TCM
- 5.7×28mm
- .224 Boz
- .221 Remington Fireball, a similar necked .22 centerfire round
- List of cartridges by caliber
- List of rifle cartridges
- 5 mm caliber
