= Reuben Harwood =

- Born: Somerville, Massachusetts
- Occupations: Gunwriter and cartridge designer
- Years active: End of the 1800s
- Notable work: .22 Harwood Hornet

Reuben Harwood (also known as Iron Ramrod) was an American gunwriter and cartridge designer from Somerville, Massachusetts, at the end of the 1800s.

Among his notable developments was the .22 Harwood Hornet, a predecessor of the modern .22 Hornet cartridge. Harwood's cartridge, unlike the modern Hornet, was formed by necking down .25-20 Winchester brass to .22 caliber, and was initially loaded with black powder. Further innovations of his included work on an auxiliary chamber, and experiments with .25 caliber rifle cartridges.
