= .22 Accelerator =

Rifle cartridge

- Type: Rifle

Production history
- Manufacturer: Remington Arms

Ballistic performance
Bullet mass/type	Velocity	Energy
55 gr (4 g) .30-30 SP	3,400 ft/s (1,000 m/s)	1,412 ft⋅lbf (1,914 J)
55 gr (4 g) .308 SP	3,770 ft/s (1,150 m/s)	1,735 ft⋅lbf (2,352 J)
55 gr (4 g) .30-06 SP	4,080 ft/s (1,240 m/s)	2,003 ft⋅lbf (2,716 J)

The .22 Accelerator is a special loading of the .30-30, .308, and .30-06 cartridges that is manufactured by Remington.

== Description ==
It consists of a sub-caliber 0.224-inch (5.7 mm) diameter bullet, held in a .30-caliber 7-grain (0.45 g) six-fingered plastic sabot with a hollowed base.

The bullet separates from the sabot approximately 14 inches (360 mm) from the muzzle.

== Usage ==
The cartridge allows for using a large-caliber rifle for varmint shooting, although the accuracy is somewhat diminished.

The advantage, however, is the extremely high muzzle velocity from factory-loaded ammunition.
