= .22 Winchester Centerfire =

Rifle cartridge

.22 Winchester Centerfire / 5.8x35mmR
- Type: Rifle
- Place of origin: United States

Production history
- Produced: 1885–1936

Specifications
- Case type: Rimmed, bottleneck
- Bullet diameter: .228 in (5.8 mm)
- Neck diameter: .241 in (6.1 mm)
- Shoulder diameter: .278 in (7.1 mm)
- Base diameter: .295 in (7.5 mm)
- Rim diameter: .342 in (8.7 mm)
- Case length: 1.39 in (35 mm)
- Overall length: 1.61 in (41 mm)

Ballistic performance
Bullet mass/type	Velocity	Energy
45 gr (3 g)	1,550 ft/s (470 m/s)	240 ft⋅lbf (330 J)

.22 Winchester Centerfire (.22 WCF) / 5.8x35mmR is a small centerfire intermediate cartridge introduced in 1885 for use in the Winchester Model 1885 single-shot rifle. Factory manufacture of ammunition was discontinued in 1936. The .22 WCF was loaded with a 45 grain bullet with a muzzle velocity of about 1550 feet per second, similar to the performance of the .22 Winchester Rimfire (.22 WRF) designed in 1890.

Experimentation with the .22 WCF among civilian wildcatters and the U.S. military at Springfield Armory in the 1920s led to the development of the .22 Hornet cartridge.

== See also ==
- List of rimmed cartridges

== Sources ==
- Barnes, Frank C., Cartridges of the World, Northfield, IL: DBI Books, 1972. ISBN 0-695-80326-3.
