= American-180 =

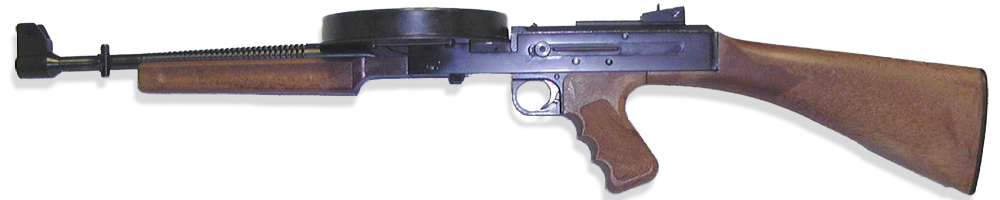
- Type: Submachine gun Semi-automatic rifle (SAR 180/275)
- Place of origin: United States

Service history
- Used by: See Users

Production history
- Designer: Richard J. Casull
- Manufacturer: Voere; Illinois Arms Company, Inc. American Arms International
- Produced: early 1970s to mid-1980s
- No. built: ~10,000
- Variants: Voere SAM-180 (semi-automatic variant) select-fire variant

Specifications
- Mass: 5.7 lb (2.6 kg) empty; 10 lb (4.5 kg) loaded with 177-round magazine
- Length: 35.5 in (900 mm)
- Barrel length: 14 in (360 mm) (select-fire variant); 17.5 in (440 mm) (semi-automatic variant)
- Cartridge: .22 Long Rifle.22 ILARCO (.22 Winchester Short Magnum Rimfire/.22 American)
- Action: blowback, open bolt
- Rate of fire: 1200 round/min (.22 Long Rifle); 1500 round/min (.22 ILARCO)
- Feed system: 165, 177, 220, or 275 round detachable pan magazine
- Sights: Fixed open sights, Factory-installed laser sights

The American-180 is a submachine gun developed in the 1960s which fires the .22 Long Rifle or .22 ILARCO cartridges from a pan magazine. The concept began with the Casull Model 290 that used a flat pan magazine similar to designs widely used prior to World War II. Only 87 Casull M290s were built, as the weapon was expensive to manufacture. The American-180 is an improved version. A semi-automatic only variant called the American SAR 180/275 is still produced on a custom basis by E&L Manufacturing of Riddle, Oregon.

== Operation ==
The weapon operates through a conventional blowback mechanism. It uses an open bolt with a flat pan magazine. It fires at a very high rate of fire of approximately 1,200 rounds per minute. The American-180 was purchased mostly by private parties prior to the Hughes Amendment in 1986, which banned the production of automatic weapons for the American civilian market. The A180 was adopted by the Utah Department of Corrections to arm prison guards.

== Variants ==
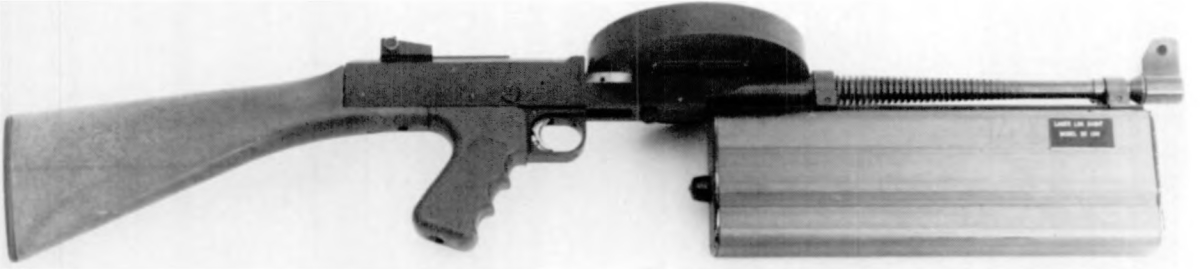
American 180 Rifle System with Laser LOK Sight

- Twin-barrelled variant: The ILARCO company manufactured the American 180 in a twin-gun configuration. The two receivers were mounted on a single stock that weighed more than 14 lb (6.4 kg), with a rate of fire over 3,000 rounds per minute.
- Quad-barrelled variant: The ILARCO company manufactured the American 180 in a quad-gun configuration. Each of the individual guns could be fired in a variety of combinations. The guns could be fired one at a time, or one on the left and one of the right, or all at once. It was mounted on a large tripod, with a rate of fire from 3,000 to 12,000 rounds per minute.

== Users ==
- Croatia: MGV-176 Slovenian-made copy, used by Croatian Guerilla forces during the Yugoslav wars
- France: Two were used respectively by the GIPN of Marseille and the Research and Intervention Brigade of Paris in the 1980s.
- New Zealand: New Zealand Police Anti-Terrorist Squad, issued in September 1978 and no longer in operational service.
- Rhodesia: Rhodesian SAS.
- South Africa: 4th Reconnaissance Regiment.
- United States: Various law enforcement agencies and correctional facilities.

== See also ==
- Calico M100, a weapon of similar design and concept
- MGV-176, modernized version of the American-180 made in the former Yugoslavia
