= ArmaLite AR-5 =

Armalite AR-5
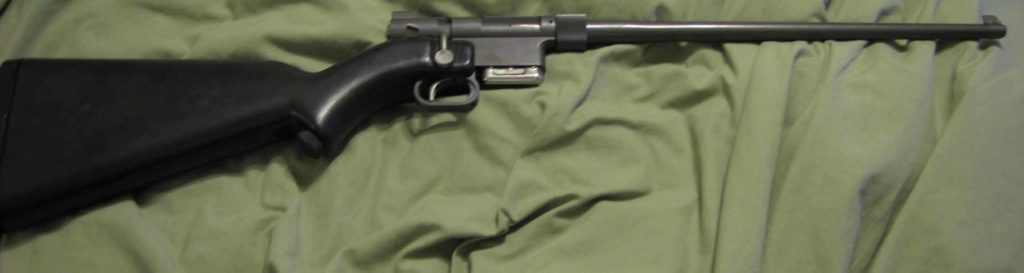
- Type: Rifle
- Place of origin: United States

Service history
- In service: 1956–1959
- Used by: United States Air Force

Production history
- Manufacturer: ArmaLite

Specifications
- Mass: 2.5 lb (1 kg)
- Length: 28 in (711 mm)
- Barrel length: 14 in (356 mm)
- Caliber: .22 Hornet
- Action: Bolt-action
- Feed system: 5-round detachable box magazine

The ArmaLite AR-5 is a lightweight bolt-action takedown rifle chambered for the .22 Hornet cartridge and adopted as the MA-1 aircrew survival rifle by the United States Air Force. It was developed by ArmaLite, a division of Fairchild Engine and Airplane Corporation in 1954.

== History ==
The U.S. Air Force needed a compact, lightweight, accurate rifle for the new XB-70 crewed bomber aircrew's survival kits. Since the M4 and M6 aircrew survival weapons were no longer in production, the Air Force put out a request for a new survival weapon. Shortly after Fairchild established the ArmaLite division in 1954, ArmaLite designed and submitted the AR-5 in response. The Air Force officially adopted the AR-5 as the MA-1 in 1956. Due to the cancellation of the XB-70 fleet, though, the Air Force never received funding to buy more than the original 12 test models. The M4 and M6 aircrew survival weapons already in inventory were judged to be sufficient for existing Air Force needs. However, adoption of the MA-1 established ArmaLite as a recognized firearms company, leading to several other rifle designs of varying success (e.g., the AR-7, AR-10 and AR-15).

== Design ==
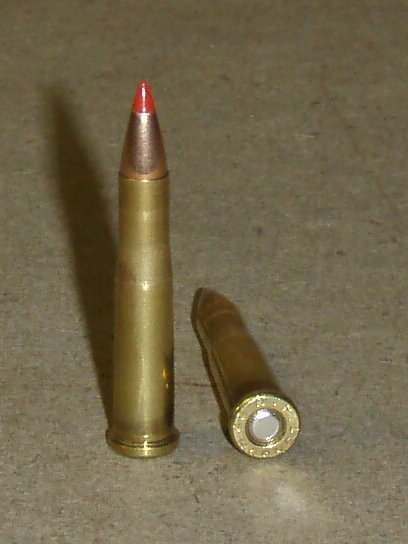
.22 Hornet

The earlier M6 Aircrew Survival Weapon is a superposed ("over-under") break action combination gun with a .22 Hornet single-shot rifle barrel over a .410 shotgun barrel. While there is versatility to such a combination, the AR-5's detachable box magazine-fed bolt action has the advantage of rapid-fire capability. The AR-5, like the M4 Survival Rifle and M6 US Air Force survival rifles, used the .22 Hornet cartridge which has 2.3 times the muzzle velocity and 5 times the energy of the common .22 Long Rifle (when comparing 40 gr bullets), and yet still has a light recoil in such a light rifle (2.5 lbs.).

Designed to be stowed in cramped aircraft cockpits, the rifle had a takedown design and was primarily made from lightweight plastics and aluminum alloys. The AR-5 was unique for being able to be disassembled with all working parts, plus a basic survival kit, and stored within the stock, which was 14 inches (36 cm) long, and thus able to fit in Air Force bailout packs. Additionally, the rifle was able to float in water, whether it was assembled or stowed.

Armalite used the research and tooling for the AR-5/MA-1 to develop the Armalite AR-7, an eight-shot semi-automatic takedown rifle chambered for the .22 Long Rifle cartridge. Released in 1959 as a civilian survival weapon and in continuous production since then, the AR-7 is related to the AR-5 in terms of its overall layout and retains the same modular takedown, storage in stock, and the ability to float.

== See also ==
- List of ArmaLite rifles
- M4 Survival Rifle
- M6 Aircrew Survival Weapon
- Marble Game Getter
- List of individual weapons of the U.S. Armed Forces
- List of firearms
