= .22 TCM =

Bottle-necked handgun cartridge

22TCM
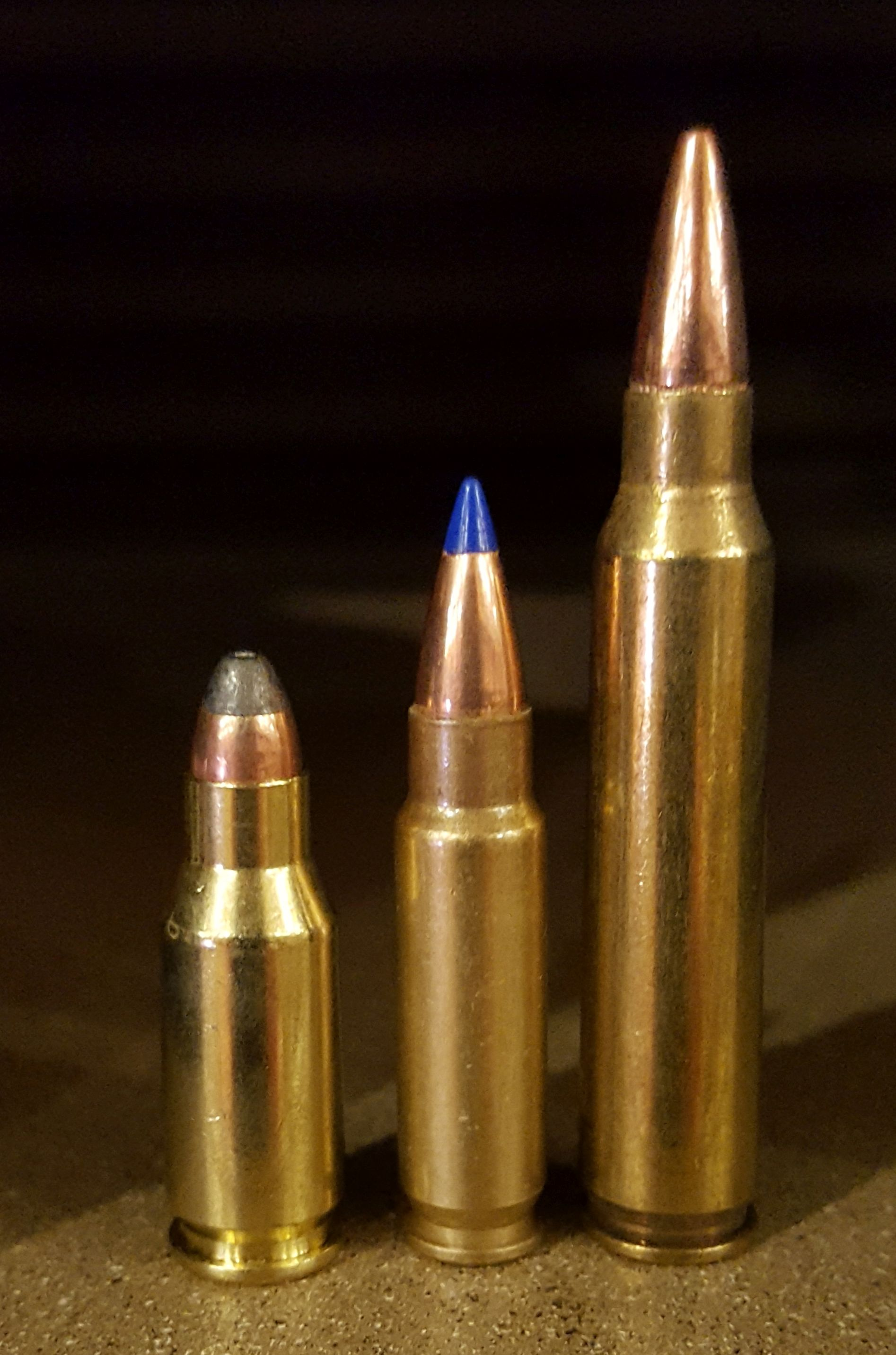
- From left: .22 TCM, FN 5.7×28mm, .223 Remington
- Type: Pistol/Rifle

Production history
- Designer: Fred Craig

Specifications
- Parent case: 5.56×45mm NATO
- Case type: Rimless, bottleneck
- Bullet diameter: 0.224 in (5.70 mm)
- Neck diameter: 0.255 in (6.48 mm)
- Shoulder diameter: 0.362 in (9.19 mm)
- Base diameter: 0.376 in (9.55 mm)
- Rim diameter: 0.378 in (9.60 mm)
- Rim thickness: 0.045 mm (0.0018 in)
- Case length: 1.022 in
- Overall length: 1.265 in
- Case capacity: 15.2 gr H2O

Ballistic performance
Bullet mass/type	Velocity	Energy
40 gr (3 g) Pointed flat nose	853 m/s (2,800 ft/s)	943 J (696 ft⋅lbf)
40 gr (3 g) Pointed flat nose	631 m/s (2,070 ft/s)	516 J (381 ft⋅lbf)
- Test barrel length: 22.75" rifle (higher velocity) and 5.0" pistol (lower velocity)

The .22 TCM (5.56x26mm, Tuason, Craig, Micromagnum) is a proprietary bottlenecked rimless cartridge derived from a 5.56×45mm NATO (.223 Remington) parent case. It was developed by custom gunsmith Fred Craig in collaboration with Martin Tuason, the President of Rock Island Armory (RIA) and Armscor. The cartridge is primarily used in Rock Island Armory M1911 pistols and the M22 TCM bolt-action rifle.

Initially known as the .22 Micro-Mag, the .22 TCM is conceptually similar to other bottlenecked pistol cartridges, such as the 7.62×25mm Tokarev and the FN 5.7×28mm. The design prioritizes high velocity and reduced recoil by trading bullet mass for speed, making it suitable for various applications.

== Design and features ==
The .22 TCM is based on the 5.56×45mm NATO case shortened to 5.56x26mm. The overall cartridge length matches .38 Super for 1911 magazine use. This design results in a cartridge approximately 3mm longer than a standard 9×19mm round. The .22 TCM was specifically engineered for the Rock Island Armory (RIA) M1911 line of pistols, which also supports 9mm barrel swaps.

The RIA M1911 A2 pistols use double-stack magazines. The .22 TCM uses Para-Ordnance P18 pattern magazines, designed for 9mm/.38 Super cartridges, and feature a double-column configuration with a 17-round capacity. They use an 8lb recoil spring. They are very easy to rack and suffer low recoil in a metal frame 1911.

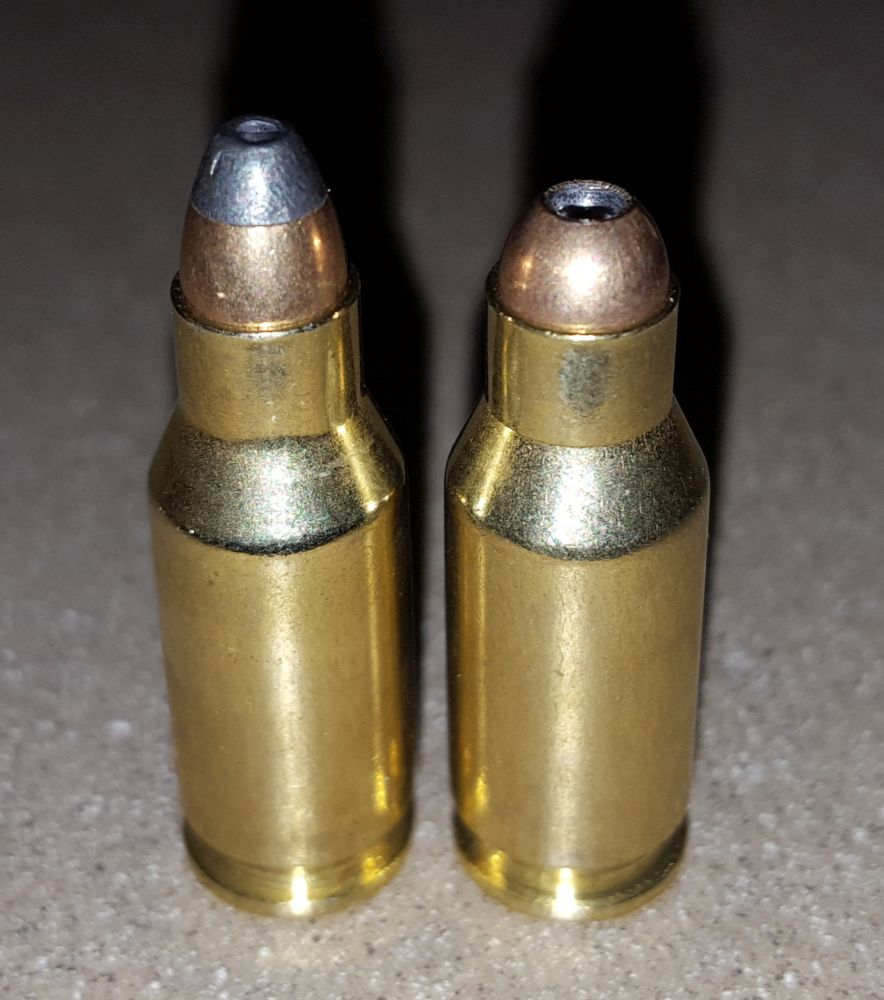
22TCM (left) with 40gr long bullet; 22TCM-9R (right) with 39gr short bullet

=== .22 TCM-9R (Glock conversions) ===
Limited production runs of Glock 19 and Glock 17 conversion barrel kits allowed these pistols to be converted to fire .22 TCM by replacing the barrel and using an 11 lb recoil spring. Complete upper conversion kits, including the slide, were also available. This led to the development of the .22 TCM-9R variant, which uses a shorter bullet and overall length compatible with Glock and other magazines designed for standard 9mm ammunition. As of May 2025, conversion kits for Glock 17 remain available.

.22 TCM-9R ammunition can be fired from standard .22 TCM firearms. The only difference is the shorter bullet and overall cartridge length, which means that magazines designed for .22 TCM-9R firearms may not accommodate all standard .22 TCM ammunition.

=== Dimensions ===
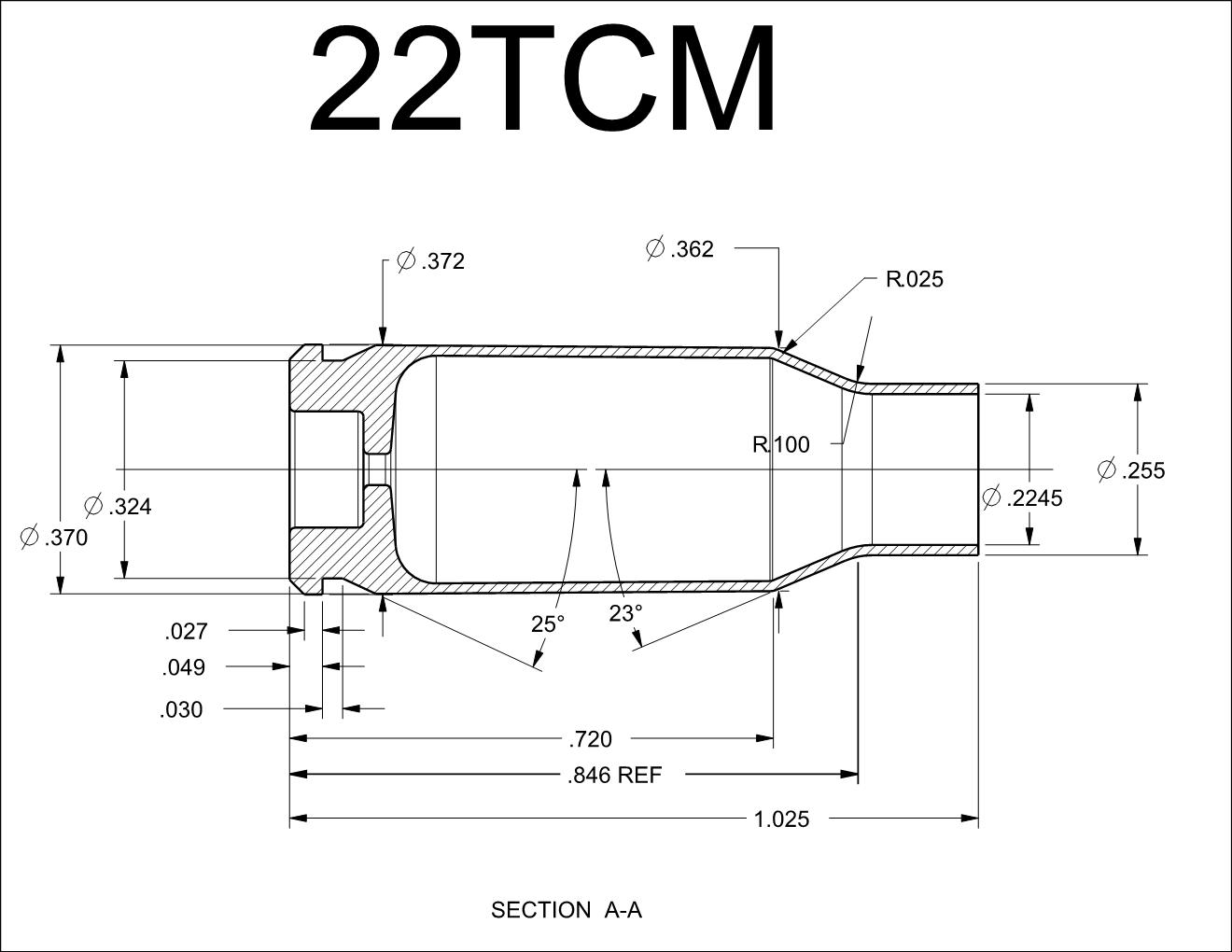
22 TCM case details

== Ammunition ==
=== Factory ammunition ===
Standard factory loads for the .22 TCM include a 40-grain jacketed hollow point (JHP), referred to as the "long slug," and a 39-grain JHP, known as the "9R" or "short slug." Both cartridges use the same .22 TCM case but differ in projectile length.

This distinction has occasionally caused confusion among users and ammunition retailers, with some mistakenly identifying the variants as separate calibers. Despite differences in projectile design, both the 40-grain and 39-grain versions can be used interchangeably in .22 TCM firearms, provided they fit within the magazine dimensions of the specific pistol or rifle being used.

22TCM Factory Ammo Performance
Brand, Bullet, Weight, Type	Velocity FPS	Velocity FPS	Group Size Inches	Group Size Inches
Armscor 40gr HP, older ammo	1,982	2,011	1.75"	1.625"
Armscor 40gr HP, newer ammo	2,044	2,061	0.875"	1.375"

=== Handloading ===
Handloaders have refined the performance of the .22 TCM by experimenting with different powders and projectiles to enhance accuracy and reliability. Renowned firearms author John Taffin has published handloading data for the .22 TCM in GUNS Magazine on two occasions: in 2017, focusing on powder loads, and in 2023, addressing the use of various projectiles.

Using Rock Island Armory M1911 pistols with 5-inch barrels, Taffin conducted tests at 20 yards with four-shot groups. The best results were achieved with Hodgdon "Lil' Gun" powder (10.5 grains) and Alliant "2400" powder (9.3 grains), both of which are fast-burning pistol powders designed for magnum and high-velocity applications. These powders significantly improved the cartridge's reliability and accuracy.

22TCM Handloaded Ammo Performance
Brand, Bullet, Weight, Type	Powder Brand	Charge Grains Weight	Velocity FPS	Group Size Inches
Armscor 40gr HP	Hodgdon Lil' Gun	10.5	2,074	1.125"
Armscor 40gr HP	Alliant 2400	9.3	1,942	0.75"

The Speer .224" 40-grain Soft Point (SP) projectile was identified as particularly well-suited for the .22 TCM. This combination of optimized powders and projectiles enhanced the cartridge's performance, making it more consistent in both velocity and accuracy.

Dies and unprimed cases for the .22 TCM are available from Hornady as of 2015–2016.

== Performance and observations ==
The .22 TCM cartridge features a bottleneck design, which can result in the case "sticking" as it fire-forms to the chamber. This issue can be mitigated by lightly oiling the chamber. Armscor's bulk factory ammunition has been noted to leave unburned powder residue inside the pistol's internals, potentially affecting reliability and producing significant muzzle flash.

The original 40-grain factory-loaded bullet offers a flat trajectory, low recoil, and moderate accuracy in pistols. However, inconsistent accuracy—such as occasional flyers and group stringing—has been reported. Additionally, the cartridge's ballistic performance and overall length have been critiqued as suboptimal for certain applications.

== Variants ==
=== 5.56×24mm Rowell ===
Randall Scott-Key introduced an improved variant of the .22 TCM cartridge, designated as the 5.56×24mm. This modification involved slightly lowering the case shoulder and neck, allowing for the use of a wider range of .224" projectiles. The design enhances reliability by functioning as a reverse piston during the firing process, improving feeding and ejection.

The 5.56×24mm variant is compatible with standard 9mm Glock magazines, further improving its practicality for use in popular firearms. Notably, this variant is fully backwards compatible, capable of being fired from any .22 TCM or .22 TCM-9R chamber.

Scott-Key highlighted the Speer .224" 40-grain Soft Point (SP) projectile as an excellent option for the cartridge, offering reliable performance across various applications.

== Compatible firearms ==
- RIA M1911 A1 with conversion kit (.22 TCM, 10-round magazine)
- RIA M1911 A2 with conversion kit (.22 TCM, 17-round magazine)
- Glock 17/22 and Glock 19/23 with RIA conversion kit (.22 TCM-9R); 17/22 and 19/23 kits both discontinued, but 17-only kit still available
- Armscor MAPP series (.22 TCM-9R; CZ-75-derived, 16-round magazine), discontinued
- Armscor "Rock" and "Tac" series (.22 TCM-9R; M1911-derived, 8–10-round magazine)
- Armscor "Tac" series (.22 TCM; M1911-derived, 17-round magazine)
- Armscor M22 bolt-action rifles (.22 TCM, 5-round magazine)
- KAK Industry AR-15 Upper (blowback)
- The AR Guy AR-15 Upper (direct impingement)

== Characteristics and applications ==
The .22 TCM is a cartridge featuring an .22 caliber projectile seated into a necked down 5.56x45mm NATO casing. Featuring low recoil compared to the 9×19mm makes it suitable for training new shooters or for individuals sensitive to recoil.

Weighing less and delivering higher velocities than the 9mm, the .22 TCM is also compared to calibers like the 7.62×25mm Tokarev and FN 5.7×28mm. These characteristics make it viable for lightweight and compact personal defense weapons (PDWs), such as AR-15-style pistols, akin to those conceptualized in the Colt MARS Program.

A notable advantage of the .22 TCM is its cost efficiency, with ammunition prices often being significantly lower than FN 5.7×28mm rounds in the U.S. and other regions.

In countries with restrictions on military calibers or bore sizes for civilian ownership, the .22 TCM has been considered a potential alternative to commonly prohibited calibers like 9mm, .45 ACP, 5.56×45mm NATO, and 7.62×51mm NATO.

=== Hunting Applications ===
The .22 TCM's parent case is derived from the .223 Remington / 5.56×45mm NATO, which are open-source designs. The cartridge has been used successfully in both pistols and bolt-action rifles for hunting varmints, such as coyotes and feral swine.

== See also ==
- .22 Spitfire
- .221 Remington Fireball, a similar necked .22 centerfire round
- 5.56×21mm PINDAD, cut down 5.56×45mm
- .224 Boz
- 5mm RRM (5.2x26mm)
- 7.62×25mm Tokarev
- 7.63×25mm Mauser
- 7.65×21mm Parabellum
- 7.65×25mm Borchardt
- FN 5.7×28mm
