= .22 BR Remington =

Rifle cartridge

The .22 BR Remington is a centerfire rifle cartridge, a smaller version of the BR family of cartridges, known for its accuracy and use in competitive shooting and varmint hunting. It is a smaller BR caliber and was developed in the early 1970’s. The quality of .22 BR Remington is known for being good, usually made of brass.

== History and design ==
The .22 BR Remington was developed around 1963 by Jim Stekl, who modified the .308 × 1.5-inch Barnes case by necking it down to .22 caliber, lengthening the case by approximately 0.020 inches, and increasing the shoulder angle to 30°. Remington standardized the cartridge dimensions and introduced brass for it in 1978.

Although never offered as a factory chambering, it has gained traction among benchrest competitors and varmint hunters, especially due to improved ease of case forming from 6 mm BR brass Sierra Bullets.

== Ballistics and reloading ==
Despite its smaller case capacity, the .22 BR can approach the performance of the .22-250 Remington, achieving similar velocities (40–60-gr bullets) while using 30–32 grains of powder compared to 35–38 grains for the .22-250. Load data, particularly from Sierra and other ballistic sources, includes velocity-energy tables showing maximum speeds nearing 3,900 fps and energies around 1,400–1,600 ft·lb across various bullet weights and powders.

== Applications ==
With its high velocity, minimal recoil, and precision, the 22 BR is well suited for:

- Varmint hunting, effective out to 300 yards and more.
- Benchrest shooting, valued for consistent accuracy.
- Anecdotal field reports describe custom rifles achieving ~4,000 fps with 40-gr bullets and exceptional success in hog control.

== Comparisons ==
Although comparable to cartridges like the .22-250, the .22 BR stands out for better accuracy, longer barrel life, and lower powder consumption. It remains a worthy option among BR family wildcats, despite being overshadowed by the popularity of 6mm BR and .22 PPC variants.
