= M4 survival rifle =

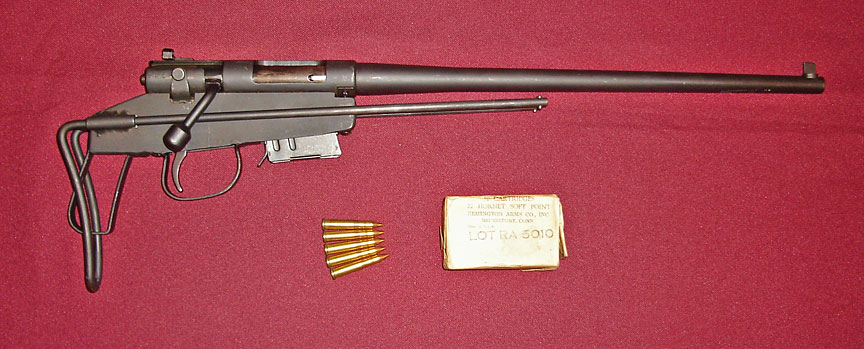
- Original US Property marked M4 Survival Rifle with military issue .22 Hornet ammo
- Type: Rifle
- Place of origin: United States

Service history
- Used by: United States Air Force

Production history
- Manufacturer: Harrington & Richardson
- Produced: 1949–1952
- No. built: 29,344

Specifications
- Mass: 4 lb (1.8 kg)
- Barrel length: 14 in (360 mm)
- Caliber: .22 Hornet
- Action: Bolt action
- Feed system: 4 shot detachable box magazine
- Sights: blade front, peep rear

The M4 Survival Rifle was a .22 caliber bolt-action rifle developed after World War II as part of the survival gear stored under the seat of American military aircraft. It was designed to give downed aircrew a survival weapon for foraging wild game for food.

== History ==
The M4 was developed from the Harrington & Richardson bolt-action M265 sporting rifle, adapted to a sheet metal frame with telescoping wire buttstock, a 14-inch detachable barrel chambered for .22 Hornet and the 4-shot detachable box magazine of the Savage Stevens M23D .22 Hornet sporting rifle. The M4 weighs approximately four pounds and with barrel detached and telescoping stock closed makes a ~14-inch overall package.

Due to the possible use of the M4 by downed aircrew as a combat weapon, the military-issue soft point ammunition in .22 Hornet carried a prohibition against this on the cartridge boxes: "Under no circumstances is the ammunition to be used for offensive or defensive measures against enemy personnel. This ammunition is provided for use with your emergency survival rifle for the killing of game for food under emergency survival conditions only." This was to comply with the Hague Convention barring the use of expanding bullets in warfare. It was later self-determined by the USAF that exigent circumstances and self-defense would have exempted soft point ammunition from that provision.

In the 1950s, the M4 was supplanted by the M6 aircrew survival weapon, and the M4 was phased out along with the decommissioning of the aircraft containing the M4 as part of their survival package. The Armalite AR-5 (MA-1) was approved as a replacement for the M4 but no significant quantities of the AR-5 were procured, as there were sufficient numbers of M4 and M6 in inventory to meet United States Air Force needs.

== Users ==
- Canada
- United States

== See also ==
- List of individual weapons of the U.S. Armed Forces
- List of firearms
