= .224 Boz =

Firearm cartridge

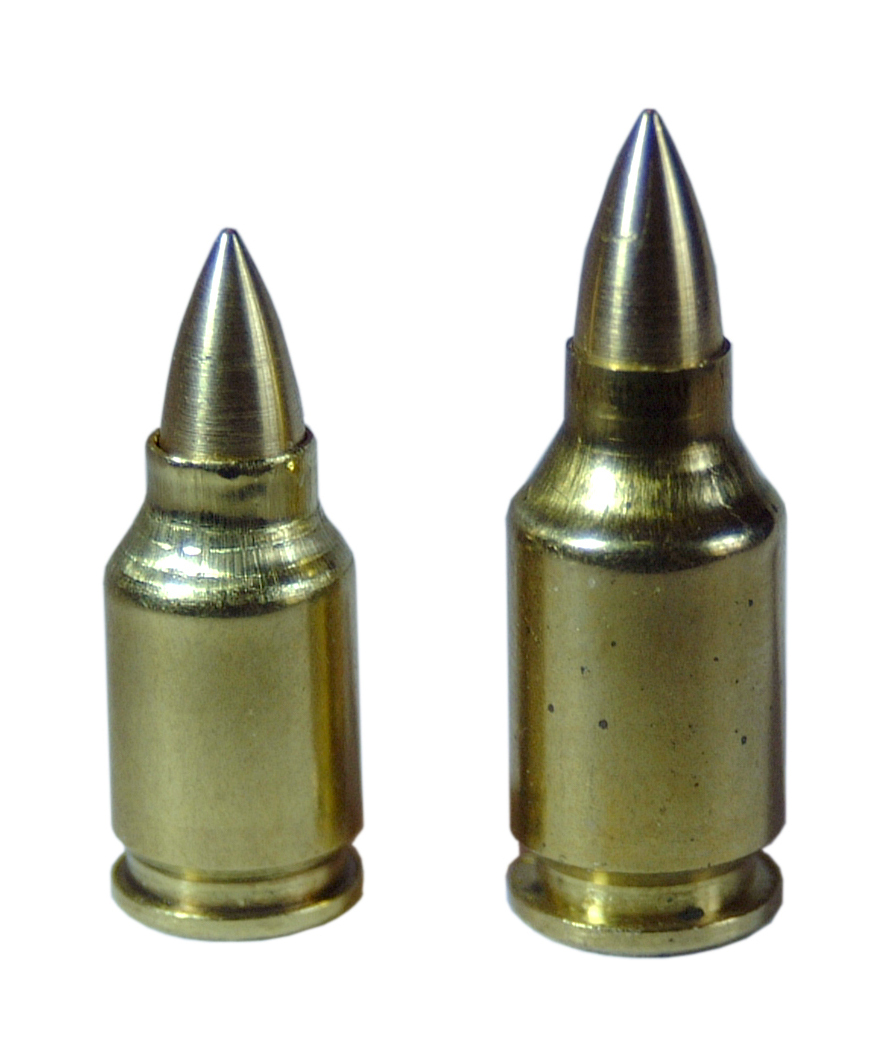
- Type: Handgun
- Place of origin: United Kingdom

Production history
- Designed: late 1990s
- Manufacturer: Civil Defence Supply (United Kingdom)

Specifications
- Parent case: 9×19mm Parabellum (originally 10mm Auto)

Ballistic performance
Bullet mass/type	Velocity	Energy
45 gr (3 g)	2,400 ft/s (730 m/s)	575.44 ft⋅lbf (780.19 J)
50 gr (3 g)	2,500 ft/s (760 m/s)	693.77 ft⋅lbf (940.63 J)
- Test barrel length: 5 in (13 cm)

The .224 Boz cartridge was developed in the late 1990s, designed as a candidate replacement cartridge for adoption as the standardized NATO ("STANAG") Personal defense weapon PDW round, originally solicited to replace the longstanding NATO standard (STANAG) 9×19mm Parabellum. It was going to be the British entry, to be evaluated alongside the Belgian FN 5.7×28mm and the German HK 4.6×30mm armor-piercing cartridges. The solicitation would also seek to find, test and standardize a PDW cartridge capable of, at the minimum, defeating the Collaborative Research Into Small Arms Technology (CRISAT) body armour of the time.

== Design ==
The .224 Boz began as a 10mm Auto case necked down to .223 in (5.7 mm). Original trials were successful, with this round firing a 50 gr (3.2 g) projectile chronographed at over 2,500 ft/s (760 m/s). During development a version based upon the 9×19 Parabellum case was also evaluated, which carried the significant advantage of being able to be utilized in pre-existing NATO standard 9×19 Parabellum caliber firearms by means of a relatively cheap barrel and caliber swap. The .22 TCM takes advantage of this same concept in its sub-variant, the .22 TCM 9R.

== See also ==
- .22 TCM
- .22 Spitfire
- HK 4.6×30mm
- 5.7×28mm
- Table of handgun and rifle cartridges
