= .22 Hornet =

Rifle cartridge

.22 Hornet (5.6x36mmR Hornet)
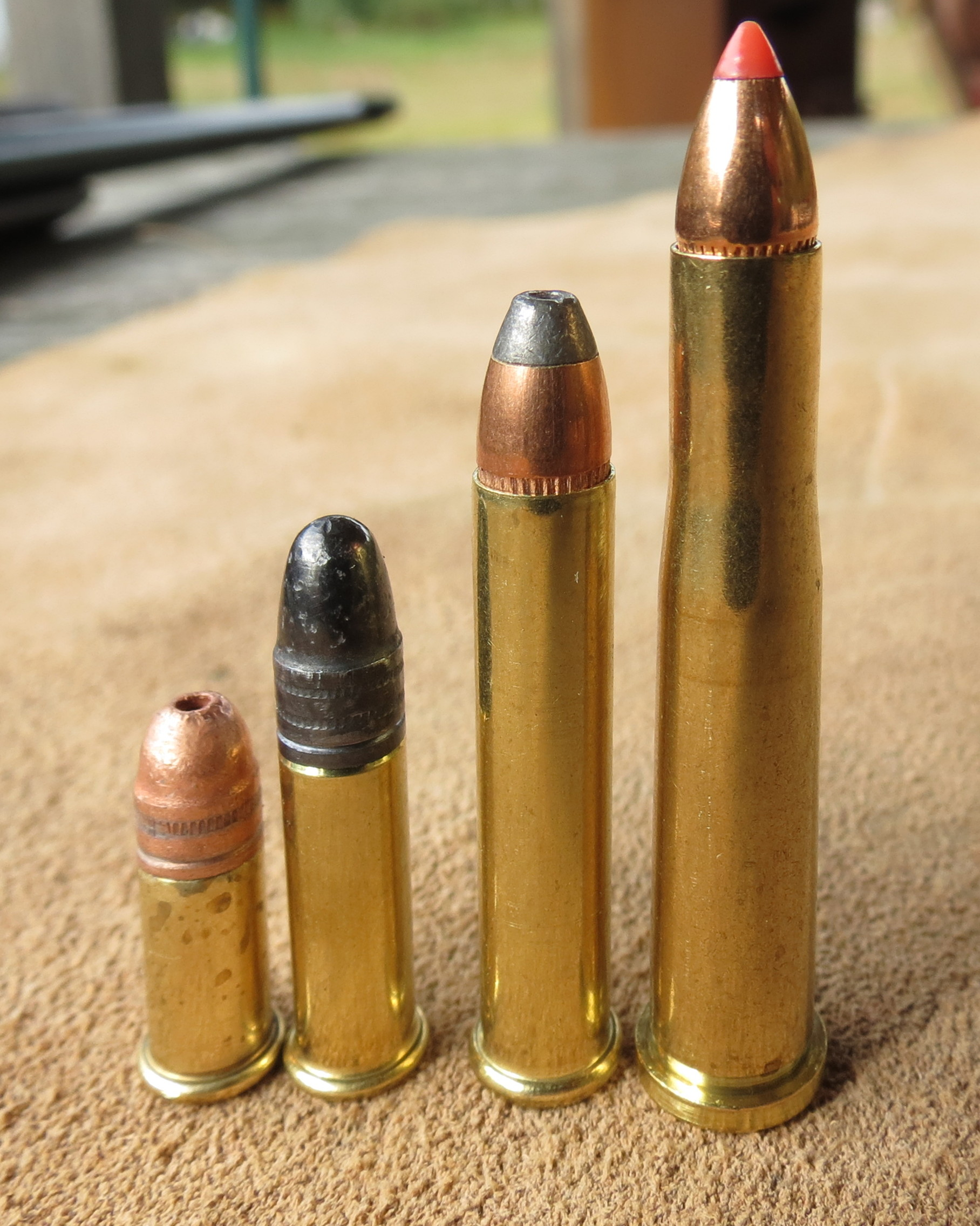
- Left to right: a .22 Short, .22 LR, .22 Winchester Magnum, and a .22 Hornet with Hornady 35 gr (2.3 g) VMax bullet
- Type: Rifle
- Place of origin: United States

Service history
- In service: 1930–present
- Used by: USAAF
- Wars: World War II

Production history
- Designer: Townsend Whelen / G. L. Wotkyns
- Designed: 1920s
- Manufacturer: Winchester
- Produced: 1930–present
- Variants: .22 Hornet Ackley.22 K-Hornet

Specifications
- Case type: Rimmed, bottleneck
- Bullet diameter: .224 (some older rifles use .223) ref Hornady
- Land diameter: .217 in (5.5 mm)
- Neck diameter: .243 in (6.2 mm)
- Shoulder diameter: .276 in (7.0 mm)
- Base diameter: .298 in (7.6 mm)
- Rim diameter: .350 in (8.9 mm)
- Rim thickness: .065 in (1.7 mm)
- Case length: 1.403 in (35.6 mm)
- Overall length: 1.723 in (43.8 mm)
- Rifling twist: 1-14
- Primer type: Small rifle
- Maximum pressure (CIP): 43,000 psi (300 MPa)
- Maximum pressure (SAAMI): 49,000 psi (340 MPa)

Ballistic performance
| Bullet mass/type | Velocity | Energy |
|---|---|---|
| 35 gr (2 g) VMax | 3,060 ft/s (930 m/s) | 728 ft⋅lbf (987 J) |
| 40 gr (3 g) SP | 2,826 ft/s (861 m/s) | 710 ft⋅lbf (960 J) |
| 45 gr (3 g) SP | 2,787 ft/s (849 m/s) | 776 ft⋅lbf (1,052 J) |
| 50 gr (3 g) SP | 2,713 ft/s (827 m/s) | 817 ft⋅lbf (1,108 J) |
| 55 gr (4 g) SP | 2,652 ft/s (808 m/s) | 859 ft⋅lbf (1,165 J) |
- Test barrel length: 24 inches Source: Hodgdon Powder Company

The .22 Hornet or 5.6×36mmR Hornet is a varminting, small-game hunting, survival and competition centerfire rifle cartridge commercially introduced in 1930. It is considerably more powerful than either the .22 WMR and the .17 HMR rimfire cartridges, achieving a higher velocity with a bullet twice the weight of that used in the .17 HMR. The Hornet also differs significantly from these in that being a centerfire cartridge makes it reloadable, and thus more versatile. It was also the smallest commercially available .22 caliber centerfire cartridge until the introduction of the FN 5.7×28mm.

The .22 Hornet should not be confused with the 5.6x35mmR Vierling. As per C.I.P., the Hornet case has a longer shoulder length, case length and thicker rim than the Vierling. This makes it very difficult to chamber the higher pressure Hornet cartridge in a Vierling rifle.

The .22 Hornet fills the gap between such popular varmint/predator cartridges as the .22 WMR and the .223 Remington. In regard to muzzle velocity, muzzle energy and noise, it is well suited to vermin and predator control in relatively built-up areas.

== History ==
Prior to the development of the modern .22 Hornet, there was a conceptually similar but physically different cartridge by the same name invented in the 1890s by Reuben Harwood (nicknamed "Iron Ramrod)", sometimes called the ".22 Harwood Hornet" to avoid confusion, as the two rounds are not compatible. Harwood's cartridge was formed by necking down .25-20 brass to .22 caliber, and was initially loaded with black powder.

The modern .22 Hornet's ancestry is generally attributed to experiments done in the 1920s using the black-powder .22 WCF at Springfield Armory. Winchester adopted what had so far been a wildcat cartridge in 1930, producing ammo for a cartridge for which no commercially made guns yet had been built. It was not until 1932 that any company began selling commercially made guns for the cartridge.

Wildcat variants of the .22 Hornet, such as the .22 K-Hornet (designed by Lysle Kilbourn) and .22 Ackley Improved Hornet, can boost bullet velocity and energy considerably above factory .22 Hornet levels, but performance still falls short of what is deer-legal in the Netherlands or the United Kingdom, although it is legal for deer in some other countries and some American states.

== Performance ==
Factory ammunition is widely available from all major manufacturers, with bullets generally weighing 34, 35, 45, or 46 grains (2.2, 2.3, 2.9, or 3.0 g), with bullets invariably either hollow point or soft point. Muzzle velocity typically is in the 2,500 to 3,100 ft/s (760 to 940 m/s) range, and muzzle energy is just over 700 ft·lbf (950 J) for factory ammo fired from a rifle. Velocities and energies are less when Hornet ammunition is fired from short-barreled firearms.

Published handload data from major handloading-product companies shows how versatile the .22 Hornet can be. According to the Hodgdon Powder Company reloading data, the heavier bullets show an affinity for Lil'Gun smokeless powder to produce much higher velocities than other powder with heavy bullets in this small case.

== Applications ==
=== Survival ===
Beginning during World War II, aircrew survival rifles in .22 Hornet were developed and issued by the U.S. military. They were a bolt-action rifle with collapsible stock (M4 Survival Rifle), a break-open rifle/shotgun over-under (M6 Aircrew Survival Weapon), and a takedown bolt-action rifle (AR-5/MA-1). Military survival issue .22 Hornet ammunition was loaded with soft-point expanding jacketed bullets, not complying with the Hague Convention. The United States was the only exception to a complete prohibition of the use of expanding bullets in war, due to its ambiguous policy. However, the cartridge boxes were labeled "Under no circumstances is the ammunition to be used for offensive or defensive measures against enemy personnel. This ammunition is provided for use with your emergency survival rifle for the killing of game for food under emergency survival conditions only."

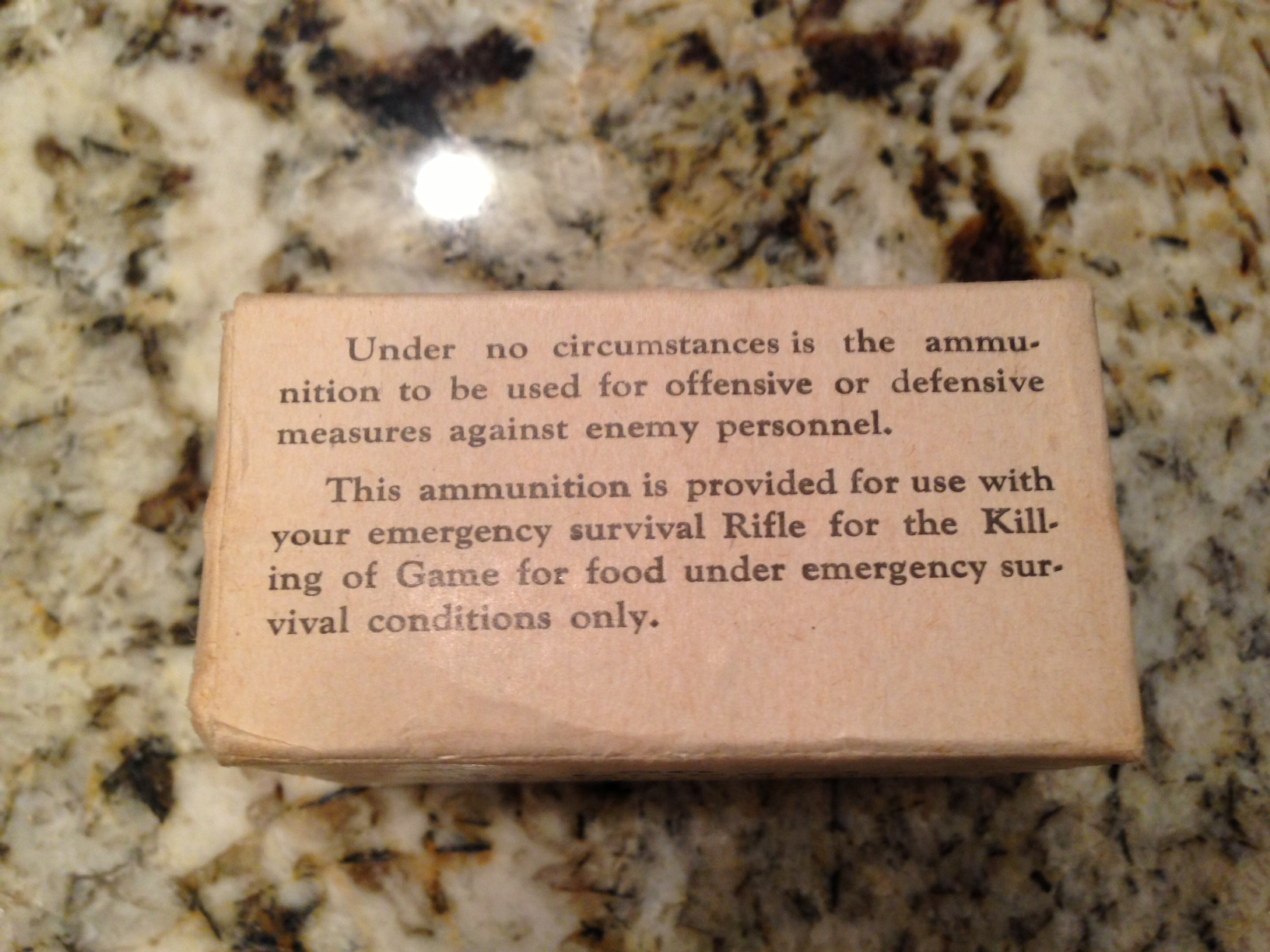
Disclosure

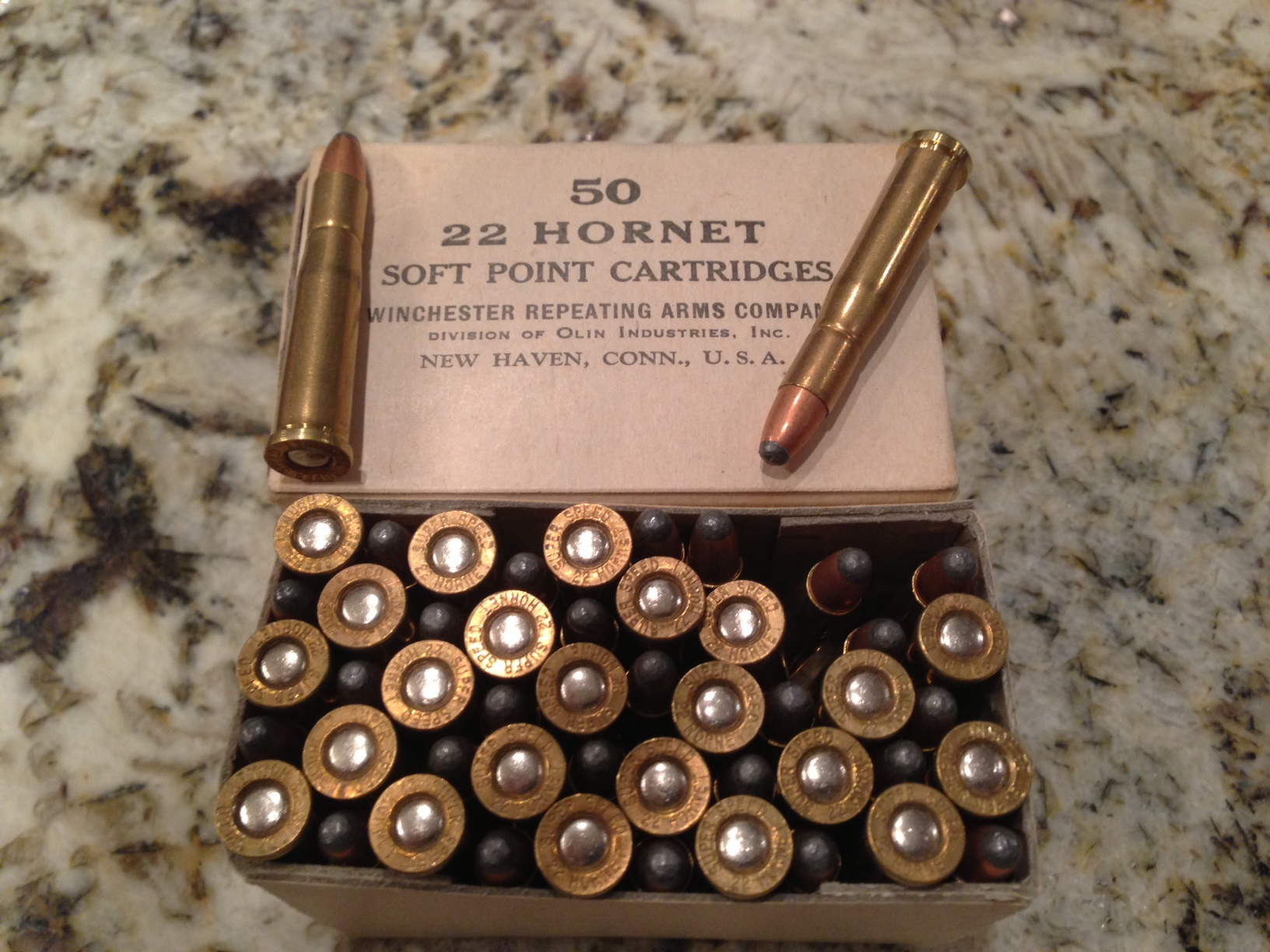
.22 Hornet Box

=== Competition ===
The .22 Hornet is a popular cartridge for the Field/Hunter's pistol category in IHMSA and NRA metallic silhouette shooting.

=== Hunting ===
Survivalist Mel Tappan on the .22 Hornet: "It is accurate, has virtually no recoil and a light report.... [I]ts performance limits its use to small game and pests within 150 to 175 yards (137 to 160 metres). It is by no means a reliable deer cartridge, even with handloads."

Sam Fadala of GUNS magazine calls it "perfect for mid-range varmints of all stripes," everything from small game, mountain birds (e.g., blue grouse), turkey, javelina, peccaries, coyote, and Australian wild pigs and goats.

The Hornet is considered an optimal cartridge for turkey hunting, though it is not as powerful as modern .22 centerfires. At mid-century, southern sportsman Henry Edwards Davis pronounced the Winchester Model 70 chambered for the Hornet "the best commercial rifle for wild turkeys the world has ever seen". In 2011, Lane Kinney was awarded the "Top Turkey in the World" award by Safari Club International for a record-setting Osceola turkey taken with a T/C Contender pistol in .22 Hornet.

The Hornet's virtual absence of recoil has made it even quite popular among deer hunters in some areas, although it is generally regarded as very underpowered for deer unless bullet placement is absolutely precise. American hunter Jack O'Connor decried this practice in the 1950s, stating the Hornet could "under no circumstances" be considered a deer cartridge. Some jurisdictions such as the Netherlands, the UK and some states in the USA currently prohibit the Hornet (and other .22 caliber cartridges) for use on deer. Other countries allow the .22 Hornet on all game, such as New Zealand.

In contrast to those who believe the little .22 Hornet is incapable on larger game, the round has proved popular among the Canadian and Alaskan Eskimo and Inuit peoples due to its low cost, who have used it extensively for hunting seals, caribou, and even polar bears.

== Firearms ==
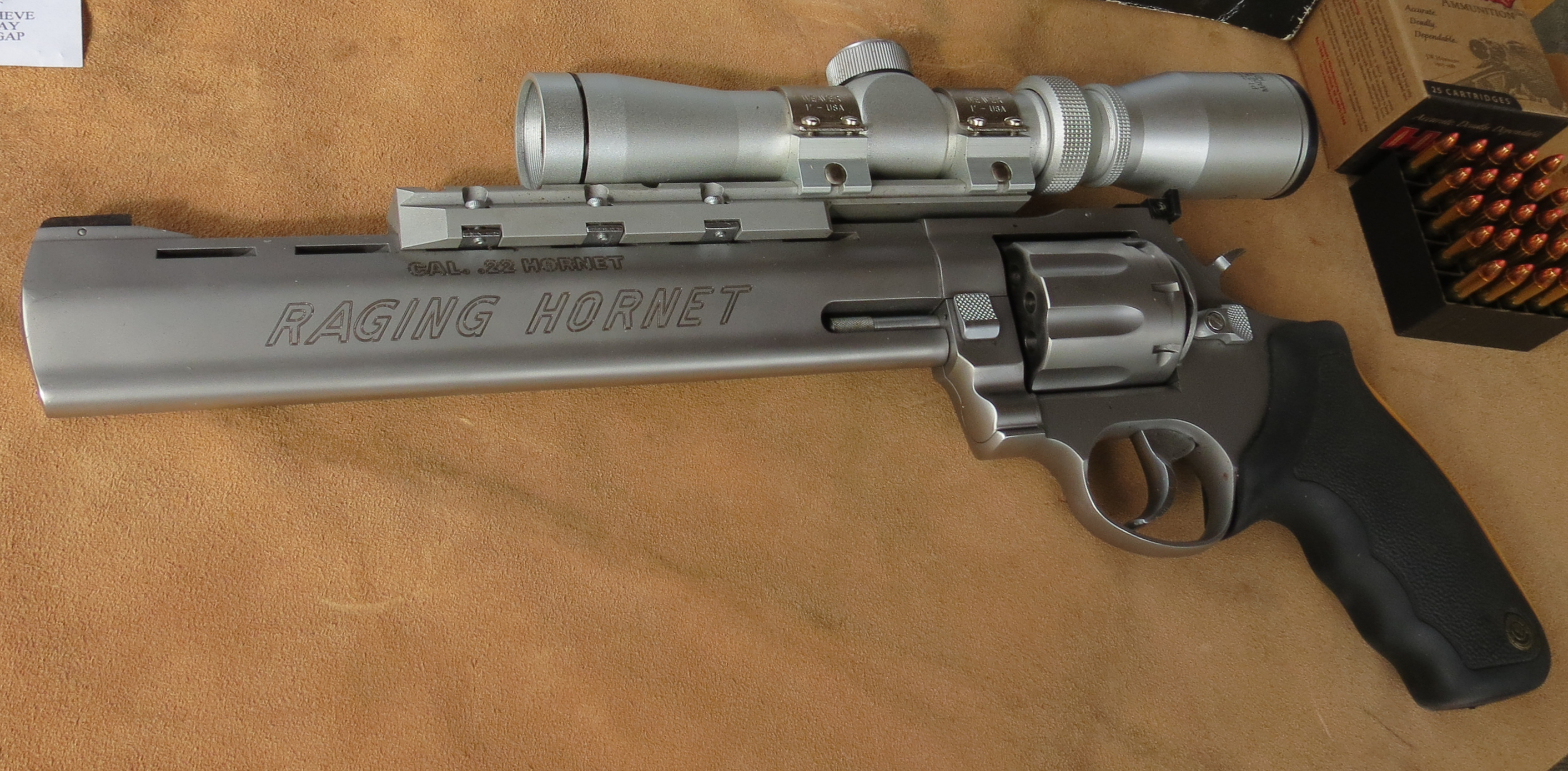
Taurus Model 22H

Rifles are currently (2007) being chambered in .22 Hornet by Ruger, New England Firearms, CZ and various other mass-market manufacturers. Most current-production rifles in .22 Hornet are either bolt-action or single-shot designs, with the exception of a very few "survival" rifle/shotgun over-under designs such as the Savage Model 24 from Savage and a few European-made kipplauf break-action single-shot rifles, and drilling break-action shotgun/rifle combinations consisting of two side-by-side shotgun barrels and a rifle barrel underneath. Older guns generally have a slower twist rate of 1-16" (or one turn in every 16 inches (410 mm) of barrel length) for lighter bullets with a .223 caliber dimension. Newer guns feature a faster 1-14" twist in the .224 bore diameter.

Revolvers have been produced in .22 Hornet by Taurus, Magnum Research, and others with Ruger releasing a large frame version in 2024. Single-shot pistols in .22 Hornet have been made by Thompson Center Arms. Muzzle velocities are somewhat less for this cartridge in short-barreled handguns than in rifles.

== See also ==
- .17 Hornet
- .22 Remington Jet
- .221 Remington Fireball
- 5 mm caliber
- List of rimmed cartridges
- List of rifle cartridges
- Sectional density
- Table of handgun and rifle cartridges
