= .22 ILARCO =

Gun ammunition

.22 Winchester Short Magnum
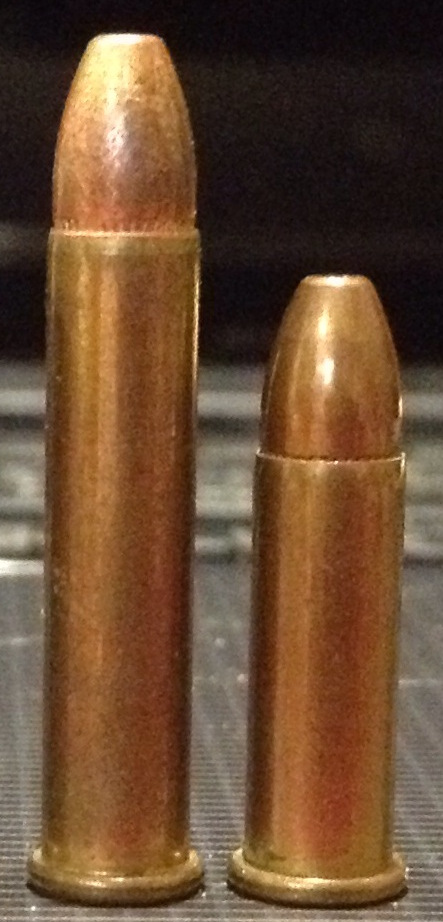
- .22 WMR (left) compared to .22 ILARCO (right)
- Type: Rifle
- Place of origin: United States

Production history
- Designed: 1987
- Manufacturer: Winchester

Specifications
- Parent case: .22 WMR
- Case type: Rimmed, straight
- Bullet diameter: .224 in (5.7 mm)
- Neck diameter: .242 in (6.1 mm)
- Base diameter: .242 in (6.1 mm)
- Rim diameter: .294 in (7.5 mm)
- Rim thickness: .050 in (1.3 mm)
- Case length: .669 in (17.0 mm)
- Overall length: .950 in (24.1 mm)
- Primer type: Rimfire
- Maximum pressure: 24,000 psi (170 MPa)

Ballistic performance
Bullet mass/type	Velocity	Energy
40 gr (3 g) FMJ	1,350 ft/s (410 m/s)	160 ft⋅lbf (220 J)

The .22 ILARCO / 5.7x24mmRF, also known as the .22 Winchester American Magnum Special, .22 Winchester Short Magnum Rimfire, or .22 American, was a rimfire cartridge designed in 1987 for the American-180 rimfire submachine gun. At the time the cartridge was created, the design of the American-180 had been taken over by the Illinois Arms Company, Inc., hence the ILARCO name.

== History ==
Sometime after the Illinois Arms Company, Inc. (ILARCO) purchased the rights to the American-180 they determined a more powerful cartridge would be appropriate, which resulted in the creation of the .22 ILARCO. The new cartridge was designed so that a simple change of barrel was all that was required to switch between standard .22 Long Rifle, for which the gun was designed, and the new cartridge.

== Dimensions and loading ==
The .22 ILARCO uses a shorter version of the .22 Winchester Magnum Rimfire case, which use the same 40 gr (2.6 g) projectile as the original .22 Winchester Magnum Rimfire cartridge.

== See also ==
- 5 mm caliber
- List of rimfire cartridges
