= List of Winchester models =

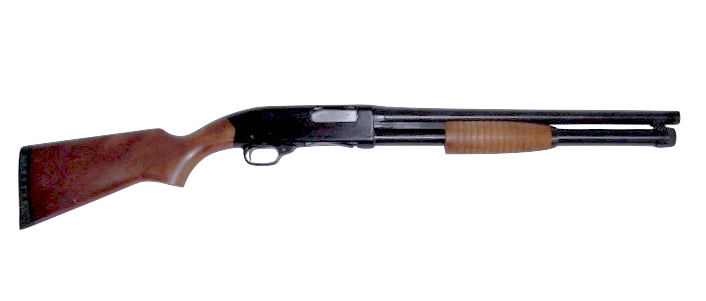
A Winchester Model 1200 shotgun

Below is a list of firearms produced by the Winchester Repeating Arms Company (later Winchester-Western Company and U.S. Repeating Arms Company), 1866–2006, by model:

== Year-model numbers 1860-1912 ==
- Model 1860 (Henry) lever-action rifle
- Model 1866 (Yellowboy) lever-action rimfire (later centerfire) rifle
- Model 1873 lever-action centerfire rifle
- Model 1876 lever-action centerfire rifle
- Model 1878 Hotchkiss bolt-action rifle (US Army and Navy)
- Model 1885 falling-block single-shot rifle
- Model 1886 lever-action centerfire rifle
- Model 1887 lever-action shotgun
- Model 1890 slide-action .22 WRF rifle
- Model 1892 lever-action centerfire rifle
- Model 1893 slide-action shotgun
- Model 1894 lever-action centerfire rifle
- Model 1895 lever-action centerfire box-magazine rifle
- Model 1895 Lee bolt-action rifle (US Navy/Marine Corps)
- Model 1897 slide-action shotgun (Model 1893 variant)
- Model 1900 bolt-action single-shot .22 rifle
- Model 1901 lever-action shotgun (Model 1887 variant)
- Model 1902 bolt-action single-shot .22 rifle (Model 1900 variant)
- Model 1903 semi-automatic .22 Win Auto rifle
- Model 1904 bolt-action single-shot .22 rifle (Model 1900 variant)
- Model 99 "Thumb Trigger" single-shot .22 rifle
- Model 1905 semi-automatic centerfire rifle
- Model 1906 slide-action .22 WRF rifle (Model 1890 variant)
- Model 1907 semi-automatic centerfire rifle (Model 1905 variant)
- Model 1910 semi-automatic centerfire rifle (Model 1905 variant)
- Model 1911 SL semi-automatic shotgun
- Model 1912 slide-action shotgun

== Sequential Model Numbers (Rifles) 1919-39 ==
In 1919 Winchester abandoned numbering models by the year of introduction and assigned two-digit numbers, sequential beginning with 51 for rifles. Older guns still in production had their model numbers truncated, e.g. the Model 1912 shotgun became the Model 12. There was one exception: the unconventional "Thumb Trigger" rifle, which was not previously numbered, was given the designation 99.

- Model 51 "Imperial" (1919) bolt-action rifle
- Model 52 (1920) bolt-action .22 match rifle
- Model 53 (1924) lever-action rifle (Model 92 variant)
- Model 54 (1925) bolt-action rifle
- Model 55 (1924) lever-action rifle (Model 94 variant)
- Model 56 (1926) bolt-action .22 rifle
- Model 57 (1926) bolt-action .22 target rifle (Model 56 target variant)
- Model 58 (1928) bolt-action single-shot .22 rifle
- Model 59 (1930) bolt-action single-shot .22 rifle (Model 58 target variant)
- Model 60 (1930) bolt-action .22 rifle (Model 58 variant)
- Model 60A (1933) bolt-action .22 single shot rifle (Model 58 variant)
  - Available in standard and target models
- Model 61 (1932) slide-action .22 WCF (later .22 rimfire and .22 WMR) rifle
- Model 62 (1932) slide-action .22 rifle (Model 90 variant)
- Model 62A (1940) slide-action .22 rifle (Model 90 variant)
- Model 63 (1933) semi-automatic .22 rifle (Model 03 variant)
- Model 64 (1933) lever-action rifle (Model 94 variant)
- Model 65 (1933) lever-action rifle (Model 92 variant)
- Model 67 (1934) bolt-action .22 rifle
- Model 677 (1937) bolt-action .22 rifle (telescopic-sight-only Model 67 variant)
- Model 68 (1934) bolt-action .22 rifle (Model 67 variant)
- Model 69 (1935) bolt-action .22 rifle
- Model 697 (1937) bolt-action .22 rifle (telescopic-sight-only Model 69 variant)
- Model 70 (1936) bolt-action rifle
- Model 71 (1935) lever-action rifle (Model 86 variant)
- Model 72 (1938) bolt-action .22 rifle
- Model 74 (1939) semi-automatic .22 rifle
- Model 75 (1938) bolt-action .22 target rifle

== Non-sequential model numbers (rifles) 1949-63 ==
- Model 43 (1949) bolt-action rifle
- Model 47 (1949) bolt-action single-shot .22 rifle
- Model 55 (1957) semi-automatic single-shot .22 rifle
- Model 77 (1955) semi-automatic .22 rifle
- Model 88 (1955) hybrid lever-action rifle
- Model 100 (1960) semi-automatic rifle
- Model 250 (1963) lever-action .22 rifle
- Model 270 (1963) slide-action .22 rifle
- Model 290 (1963) semi-automatic .22 rifle

== Non-sequential model numbers ==
- Model 121 (1967) bolt-action single shot .22 rifle
- Model 131 (1967) bolt-action .22 rifle (repeating Model 121 variant, box magazine)
- Model 141 (1967) bolt-action .22 rifle (repeating Model 121 variant), butt stock tube fed rifle.
- Model 150 (1967) lever-action .22 rifle (Model 250 variant)
- Model 190 (1966) semi-automatic .22 rifle
- Model 255 (1964) lever-action .22 WMR rifle (Model 250 variant)
- Model 275 (1964) slide-action .22 WMR rifle (Model 270 variant)
- Model 310 (1972) single shot .22 rifle
- Model 320 (1972) bolt-action .22 rifle 5 or 10 round box magazine
- Model 325 (1972) bolt-action .22 WMR rifle (Model 320 variant)
- Model 490 (1975) semi-automatic .22 rifle
- Model 670 (1966) bolt-action rifle
- Model 770 (1969) bolt-action rifle
- Model 9422 (1972) lever-action .22 rifle

== Model numbers (shotguns) 1919-63 ==
- Model 20 (1920) single-shot shotgun
- Model 21 (1931) double-barrel shotgun
- Model 24 (1939) double-barrel shotgun
- Model 25 (1949) slide-action shotgun (Model 12 variant)
- Model 36 (1919) single-shot 9mm rimfire shotgun (Garden Gun) (Model 1900 variant)
- Model 37 (1936) single-shot shotgun
- Model 40 (1939) semi-automatic shotgun
- Model 41 (1920) bolt-action single-shot .410-bore shotgun
- Model 42 (1933) slide-action .410-bore shotgun (Model 12 variant)
- Model 50 (1954) semi-automatic shotgun
- Model 59 (1960) semi-automatic shotgun
- Model 101 (1963) over/under shotgun

== Model numbers (shotguns) 1964-2006 ==
- Model 22 (1975) sxs shotgun
- Model 23 (1978) double-barrel shotgun
- Model 37A (1973) single-shot shotgun (Model 37 variant)
- Model 96 (1976) over/under shotgun
- Model 370 (1972) single-shot shotgun (Model 37 variant)
- Model 1200 (1964) slide-action shotgun (Model 12 replacement)
- Model 5500 under-over shotgun (1987)

(Model 1200 variant)

- Model 1400 (1964) semi-automatic shotgun
- Model 1500 (1978) semi-automatic shotgun (Model 1400 variant)
- The Winchester 1300 shotgun was first introduced in around 1981, when the US Repeating Arms Company (USRAC) took over production of the 'Winchester' brand guns from the Olin / Winchester corporation.
- Model 9410 (2001) lever-action .410-bore shotgun (Model 94 variant)
- Super-X Model 1 (1974) semi-automatic shotgun

== See also ==
- Winchester rifle

== Bibliography ==
- Houze, Herbert G. To the dreams of youth: Winchester .22 Caliber Single Shot Rifle. Iola, WI, USA: Krause Publications, Inc. 1993. ISBN 0-87341-237-0
