= Ruger No. 3 =

- Type: Single-shot rifle
- Place of origin: United States

Production history
- Designer: William B. Ruger
- Manufacturer: Sturm, Ruger & Co., Inc.
- Unit cost: $165 (1973)
- Produced: 1973–1986
- No. built: Over 30,000
- Variants: Viper simulator

Specifications
- Mass: 6 lb (2.7 kg) (.45-70 variant)
- Length: 38.5 in (980 mm)
- Barrel length: 22 in (560 mm)
- Cartridge: Various (See Article)
- Action: Farquharson-style hammerless falling block
- Sights: none, or open sights

The Ruger No. 3 is a single-shot rifle produced by Sturm, Ruger & Co from 1973 to 1986. It is based on the Ruger No. 1, with some modifications made to reduce costs, such as a simpler one-piece breech lever. It also was shipped with an uncheckered stock and a plastic buttplate. It has been described as "superbly accurate".

Approximately 1400 No. 3 actions were installed into FGR-17 Viper antitank rocket launcher tubes and used for sub-caliber training.

The No. 3 was chambered for .22 Hornet, .223 Remington, .30-40 Krag, .375 Winchester, .44 Magnum, and .45-70.
