= Sharps-Borchardt Model 1878 =

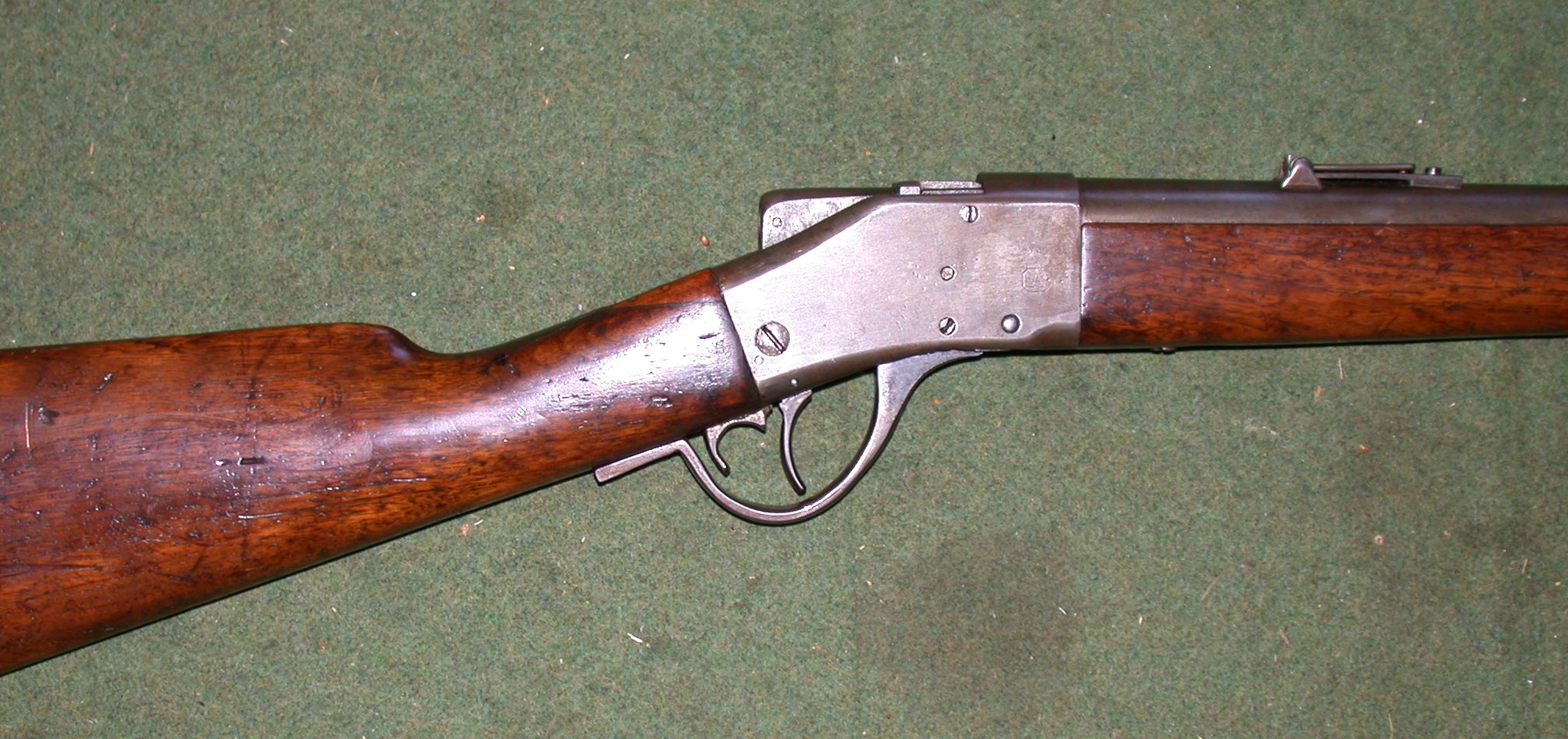
- Type: Single-shot rifle
- Place of origin: Designed in Germany: Borchardt / Manufactured in USA: Sharps

Production history
- Designer: Hugo Borchardt
- Manufacturer: Sharps Rifle Manufacturing Company
- Produced: 1878–1881
- No. built: 8,700

Specifications
- Cartridge: .45 and .50-caliber Sharps
- Action: Hammerless, falling-block, single-shot

The Sharps-Borchardt Model 1878 is a single-shot hammerless falling-block action rifle designed by Hugo Borchardt and made by the Sharps Rifle Manufacturing Company. It closely resembles older Sharps Rifles but has a firing mechanism that uses a hammerless striker rather than a hammer and firing pin like the old Sharps Rifle. This hammerless dropping-block breech-loader was based on a patent granted to Hugo Borchardt in 1877. It was the last of the Sharps single-shot rifles, and the Borchardt did not sell very well. According to company records 8,700 rifles were made in all models from 1878 until the Sharps Rifle Co. closed down in 1881. Although it was designed for the huge black powder "buffalo" cartridges of the day, it came too late, at the very end of the great bison slaughter.

Several variants were produced: Carbine, Military, Short Range, Mid Range, Long Range, Hunter, Business, Sporting, and Express. The Military Sharps-Borchardt was made only in .45-70 with 32" round barrels and was purchased by the militias of the states of Michigan, North Carolina, and Massachusetts. The other models were manufactured in a variety of calibers, barrel types, sights, stocks, engraving, etc. and were designed for varying purposes. The Hunters variation was the most affordable.

Notwithstanding its lack of commercial success the Sharps-Borchardt is admired for its strength and accuracy: reputed to be one of the strongest if not the strongest rifle action ever built before the latter 20th century. The gun was revolutionary at its time for its use of coil springs as opposed to flat springs. These guns were popular among long-range shooters and Creedmore Match competitors. Many were rechambered for use as small bore varmint rifles. Surviving guns are highly prized by collectors, especially unmodified examples chambered for heavy .45 and .50-caliber Sharps big-game cartridges.

== See also ==
- Farquharson rifle
- Ruger No. 1
