= Winchester Model 69 =

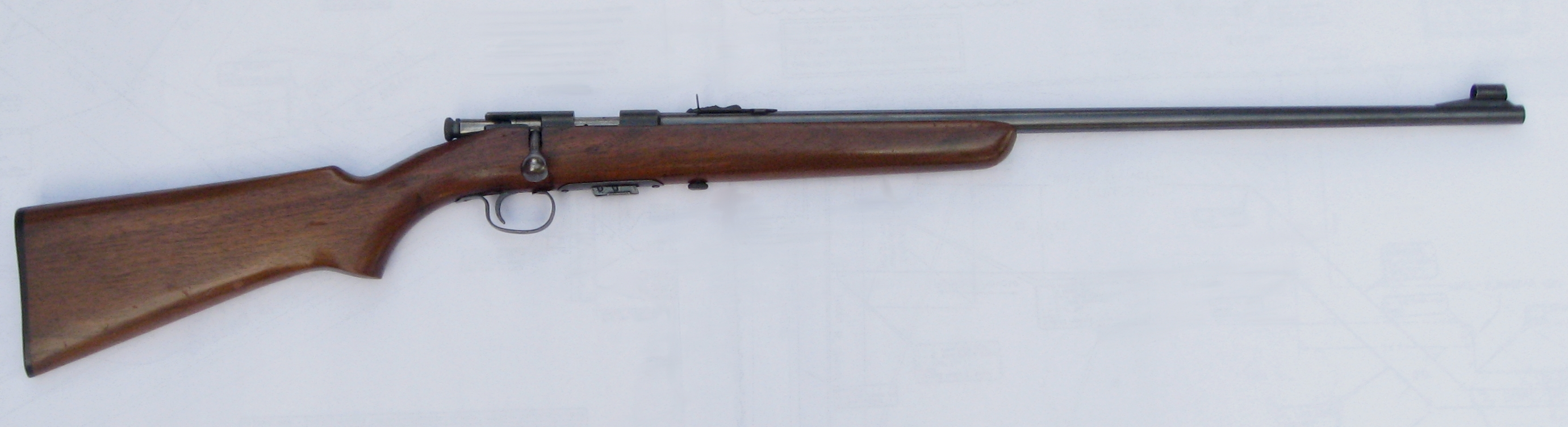
- Early Model 69 with hooded front sight
- Type: Rifle
- Place of origin: United States

Production history
- Designer: Frank F. Burton
- Designed: 1934
- Manufacturer: Winchester Repeating Arms Company
- Produced: 1935–1963
- No. built: c. 355,363
- Variants: 69A, 697

Specifications
- Mass: About 5 lb (2.3 kg)
- Barrel length: 25 in (640 mm)
- Cartridge: .22 Long Rifle, .22 Long, or .22 Short
- Action: Bolt action
- Muzzle velocity: 1,280 ft/s (390 m/s)
- Feed system: 5-round detachable box magazine standard; 10-round detachable box magazine or single-shot adapter optional
- Sights: Blade front and buckhorn rear open sights standard; hooded front sights, rear peep sights, and telescopic sights optional

The Winchester Model 69 is a bolt-action .22 caliber repeating rifle first produced in 1935 by the Winchester Repeating Arms Company. It was marketed as Winchester's mid-priced bolt-action rimfire sporting rifle, positioned above inexpensive single-shot rifles such as the Model 68 and beneath the prestigious Model 52. Model 69/69A were sold with both a short and Long Rifle 5 shot magazine until circa 1945.

An uncommon Model 69 variant, the Model 697, was offered with a telescopic sight and no provisions for iron sights. Production of the 697 ended in 1942.

== Origins and design ==
During the early 1930s, Winchester management was disappointed with the slow sales of the Model 56 and Model 57. Potential buyers considered the Model 56 and 57's 22 in (560 mm) barrels too short and the rifles' prices too high. The Model 69 was conceived as a lower-priced replacement with a longer 25 in (640 mm) barrel. The rifle was designed in 1934 by Winchester employee Frank F. Burton, production was announced with the release of Winchester's new price list on 1 January 1935, and the first completed rifles were shipped in March of the same year.

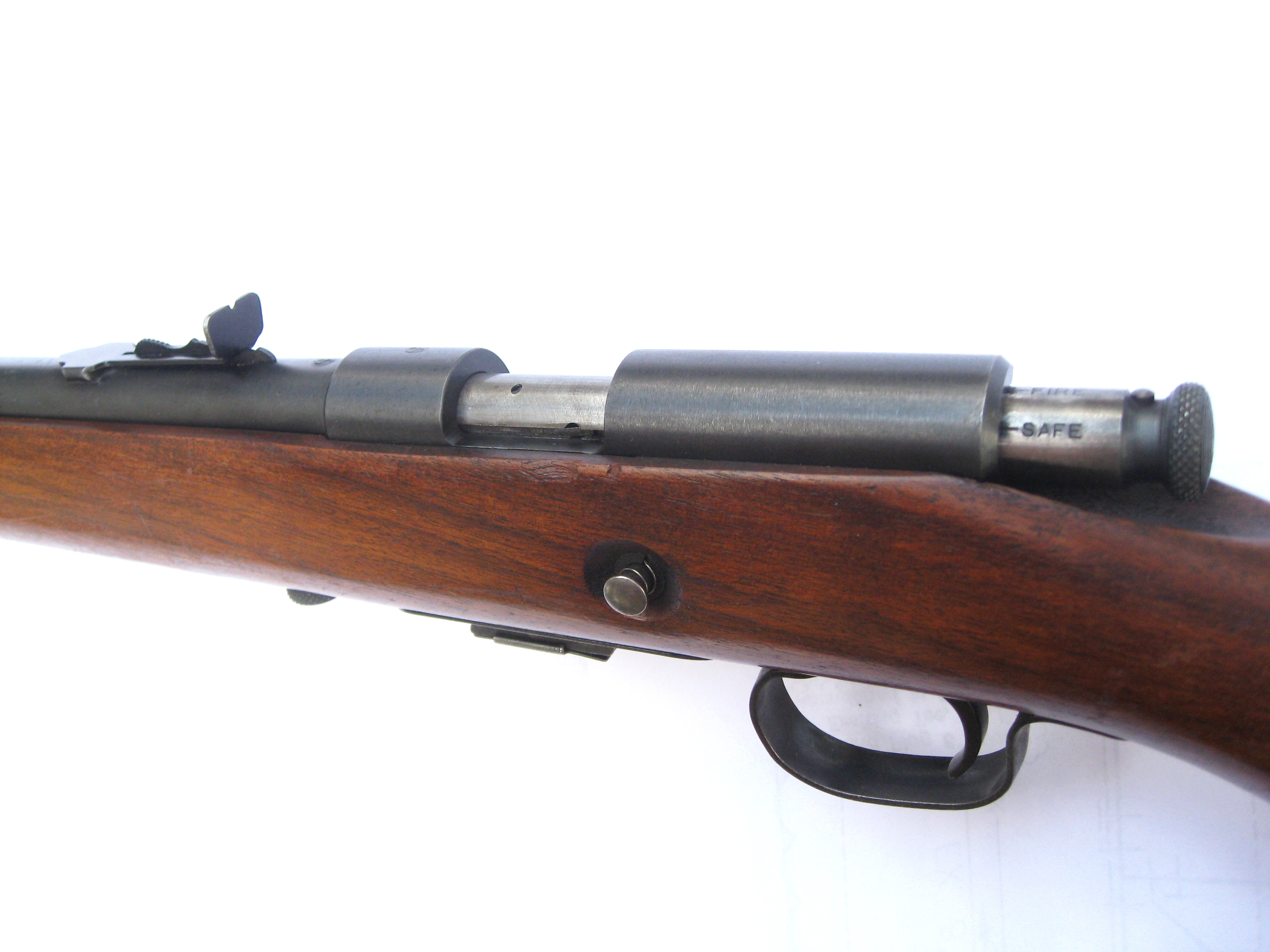
Early 1935 Model 69 action; note "SAFE" and "FIRE" markings on cocking piece, protruding takedown screw under stock, and magazine-release button on side of stock.

The striker of the Model 69 was cocked by the closing motion of the bolt, and the safety was actuated by grasping the cocking piece at the rear of the bolt, drawing it back, and rotating it, an arrangement similar to the Mosin–Nagant. The Model 69 used the same standard 5-round box magazine as the Models 52, 56, 57 and 75, allowing optional 10-round magazines and single-shot adapters to be shared. The magazine was released by depressing a spring-loaded button on the left-hand side of the stock, which was made of plain uncheckered walnut and had a pronounced pistol grip. The rifle was a takedown design; the barreled action was easily removed by turning a screw under the stock using a penny. A removable sheetmetal hood for the front sight was available. Rear sight choices included a barrel-mounted buckhorn sight that was drift-adjustable for windage and a more sophisticated receiver-mounted peep sight. A composition buttplate was used on all models.

In August 1935, the bolt was redesigned to incorporate a rebounding firing pin in compliance with Canadian import regulations. In October 1937, the stock was enlarged so the takedown screw would fit flush with the bottom, the forearm was changed to a semi-beavertail shape, and the pistol grip was made more pronounced.

Winchester-branded telescopic sights were first offered in 1937. Options were a 2 3/4-power scope with crosshairs or a vertical aiming post and a 5-power scope with crosshairs. Open sights were retained; the scopes were boxed separately and attached to integral bases on the barrel by the rifle's buyer.

== Model 69A introduced ==
In November 1937, several substantial design changes were made. The bolt was redesigned to cock on opening, the safety was changed to a sliding lever on the right-hand side of the receiver, the prominent rear cocking piece was eliminated, and the barrel was given a constant-diameter round contour rather than the previous slightly tapered contour, increasing the weight of the rifle slightly. The trigger mechanism also incorporated an internal screw adjustment, allowing the owner to adjust the trigger pull weight to some degree. The improved rifle was designated as the Model 69A.

The Model 69 was originally marketed primarily for hunting and informal plinking rather than formal target shooting. However, December 1940 saw the introduction of "Target" and "Match" versions of the Model 69, intended to fill out Winchester's target-rifle lineup beneath the top-of-the-line Model 52 and the mid-priced Model 75. Both new Model 69 variants had a slightly larger stock than the standard rifle and were chambered in .22 Long Rifle only. The Target model was advertised with a Winchester #80A aperture sight and a post front sight, while the Match model had a Lyman #57E peep sight, a hooded front sight, and a 1 in (25 mm) wide leather sling; the sling width was changed to 1 1/4 in (32 mm) in 1947.

The generally unpopular factory telescopic sight options were dropped in 1941.

== Model 697 ==
In January 1937, Winchester introduced the Model 697, a Model 69 variant with the same telescopic sight options as the standard model but without any provisions for open sights. The new model was first shipped in June 1937 and was soon updated to the improved Model 69A standard. The Model 697 was unpopular due to dissatisfaction with the factory scope mounts and was permanently discontinued in 1941. The uncommon Model 697 commands several times the value of a standard Model 69 amongst modern-day collectors.

== Later changes ==
A few minor changes were made to the Model 69A after World War II. The bolt handle was changed from a straight to a slightly swept-back shape, a grooved trigger was introduced, and the receiver became available with grooves for aftermarket scope mounts. Late in the production run, chromed bolts, trigger guards, and magazine guard plates were introduced.

Production ended in 1963 after approximately 355,363 examples of all types were sold. Model 69s were never produced with serial numbers, which were not required on rifles and shotguns sold in the United States prior to the Gun Control Act of 1968. The Model 69 was retired without a direct replacement; all other mid-priced .22 bolt-action repeaters had already been dropped from the Winchester lineup, leaving the Model 52 standing alone in the catalog until the introduction of the Model 131 in 1967.
