= Winder musket =

- Type: Rifle
- Place of origin: United States

Service history
- Used by: United States Army

Production history
- Designed: 1904

Specifications
- Cartridge: .22 Short.22 Long Rifle
- Action: Falling block action
- Feed system: Single Shot, breechloading

The Winder musket was a .22-caliber training rifle used by the US Army in the early 20th century.

== History ==
The Winchester "Winder" musket was the brainchild of Colonel C. B. Winder, who advocated marksmanship training with a rifle of similar size and weight to a service rifle but chambered in .22 rimfire, which was both economical and suitable for indoor ranges. The Winder musket was based on the Winchester Model 1885 single-shot rifle.

Although it was never officially referred to as the Winder musket, the weapon was informally named in honor of Colonel C. B. Winder and has since generally been referred to as the Winder musket.

Winder muskets were used for target and training purposes well into the early twentieth century. Many were purchased by the United States Ordnance, and many were issued to American N.R.A. affiliated rifle clubs. The Winder musket was superseded by the 1922 Model bolt-action training rifle, and remaining Winder muskets were sold.

== Design and Features ==
The action for the Winder musket was originally developed by John Browning. Winchester bought the patent and manufacturing rights from Browning in 1883.

The Winder musket featured a full stock and was chambered for .22 Short or .22 Long Rifle. It had a 28-inch barrel and an overall weight of 8.5 lbs.

== Variants ==
The Winder musket was produced a "high wall" version and a "low wall" version, with the name referring to the height of the side walls of the action alongside the falling block and the hammer. There were two major high wall variants and one low wall variant.

The Winder musket was also produced in both military and civilian versions.
