= Sliding block =

Sliding block may refer to:

- sliding-block action
- sliding-block puzzle
