= Winchester Model 121 =

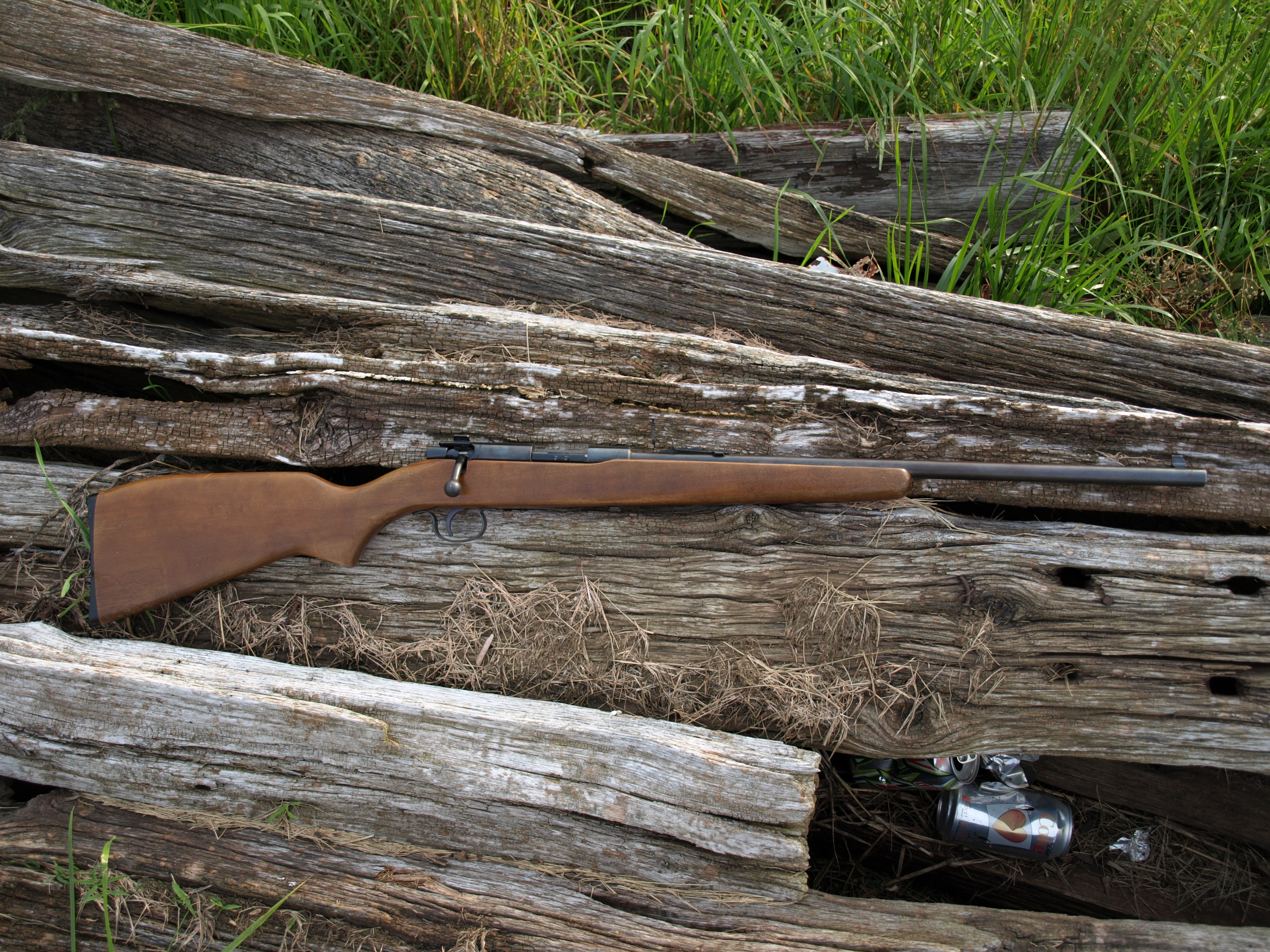
- 1967 Winchester 121
- Type: Bolt-action rimfire rifle
- Place of origin: US

Production history
- Designer: Winchester Repeating Arms Company
- Produced: 1967–1973
- No. built: 72,561
- Variants: Model 121 Youth, Model 121 Deluxe

Specifications
- Mass: 5 pounds (2.3 kg)
- Length: 40 inches (100 cm)
- Barrel length: 20.75 inches (527 mm)
- Cartridge: .22 Short, .22 Long, or .22 Long Rifle
- Action: Bolt-action
- Sights: Rear: Open, adjustable for elevation and windage. Front: Bead on 121 and 121 Youth. Ramp on 121 Deluxe. Both dovetailed in barrel.

The Winchester Model 121 is a single-shot bolt-action .22 caliber rimfire rifle that was produced from 1967 to 1973 by the Winchester Repeating Arms Company. The 121 can fire .22 Short, .22 Long, or .22 Long Rifle cartridges from its 20¾" barrel. The barrel rifling is 1 turn in 16 inches with a right-hand twist. The bolt is a controlled-round feed design (like that of the Winchester Model 70) and utilizes dual locking lugs on the front. The rifle also has an automatic safety that is engaged each time the bolt is cycled, so any time a round is loaded the safety is on and has to be manually turned off before the rifle is ready to fire. The Model 121 came with iron sights, with the rear sight being adjustable for elevation and windage. The receiver is also grooved to accept a scope if one is so desired. The Model 121's stock is a one-piece modified Monte Carlo, made of American hardwood with a Walnut finish.

== Variants ==
The Winchester 121 was also available as a Deluxe model or a Youth model. The 121 Deluxe featured a stock with a fluted comb, sling swivels, a front ramp sight with a dovetailed bead, and a deluxe trigger mechanism. The 121 Youth used a shorter length-of-pull stock that measured 12¼ inches and a shorter overall length of 38¾ inches that was suited for smaller shooters.

The Winchester Model 131 is a magazine fed bolt action repeater. The magazine holds 7 rounds. Unlike the model 121 the safety is manual and it is not turned on when a round is loaded. The safety may be on or off when a round is loaded. Incorrect assembly of the safety mechanism on the Model 131 can cause accidental discharge and failure of the safety mechanism by allowing the safety mechanism to walk on the retaining bolt. Verify the safe operation of the safety mechanism before operating this firearm. This firearm was also sold as a Sears Model 2C and should be given the same consideration.

The 135 was similar to the 131 but was in a .22 W.M.R caliber.

The Winchester Model 141 is a tubular feed bolt action repeater through the butt of the stock.

== Store-branded versions ==
Sears and Roebuck sold a private label version of the 121, calling it the Model 1T

== See also ==
- List of firearms
- List of Winchester models
