= Winchester Model 1885 =

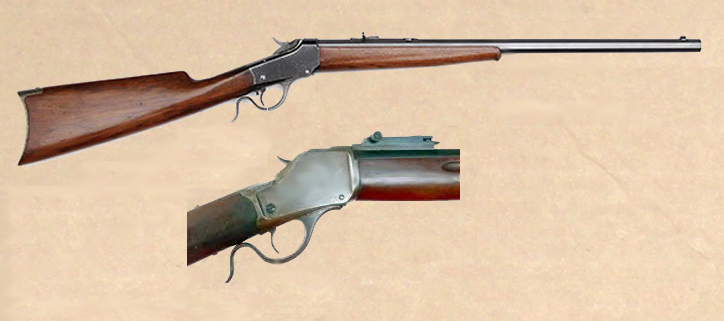
- Type: Rifle
- Place of origin: United States

Production history
- Designer: John Browning
- Manufacturer: Winchester
- Produced: 1885–1920

Specifications
- Barrel length: 26 inches (66 cm)
- Action: Falling-block

The Winchester Model 1885 is a single-shot rifle with a falling-block action. It was principally designed by John Browning. Two models were produced, the Low Wall and the High Wall.

== History ==
In 1878, the 23-year-old Browning designed a falling-block single-shot rifle, for which he was granted a patent the following year. Browning and his brother commenced making the rifles by hand in their second-floor workshop in Ogden, Utah, with limited success.

In 1883, Thomas G. Bennett, vice-president and General Manager of the Winchester Repeating Arms Company, traveled to Ogden and negotiated the purchase of the single-shot design, as well as the prototype of what would become the Model 1886 lever-action – the beginning of the fruitful 20-year Winchester–Browning collaboration. Winchester's engineers made some improvements to Browning's design, including angling the block at six degrees to create a positive breech seal, and released the rifle as the Model 1885. Two popular models were made, the so-called Low Wall which showed an exposed hammer, firing less powerful cartridges, and the so-called High Wall for stronger cartridges whose steel frame covered most of the firing hammer when viewed from the side; but both were officially marketed by Winchester as the Single Shot Rifle.

It was produced principally to satisfy the demands of the growing sport of long-range "Match Shooting", which opened at Creedmoor, New York, on June 21, 1872. Target/Match shooting was extremely popular in the US from about 1871 until about 1917, enjoying a status similar to golf today, and the Winchester company, which had built its reputation on repeating firearms, had in 1885 challenged the single-shot giants of Sharps, Remington, Stevens, Maynard, Ballard et al., not only entering the competition, but excelling at it, with Major Ned H. Roberts (inventor of the .257 Roberts cartridge) describing the Model 1885 Single Shot as "the most reliable, strongest, and altogether best single shot rifle ever produced."

Winchester produced nearly 140,000 Single Shot rifles from 1885 to 1920, and it was found that the falling-block Model 1885 had been built with one of the strongest actions known at that time. The falling block action was so strong that the Winchester Company used it to test fire newly created rifle cartridges. To satisfy the needs of the shooting and hunting public, the Model 1885 Single Shot was eventually produced in more calibers than any other Winchester rifle. Winchester also produced a large number of Single Shots in .22 caliber for the US Army as a marksmanship training rifle, the "Winder musket."

In 2005, Winchester reintroduced their famed 1885 Single Shots, labeled the Limited Series. The 21st-century Winchester Single Shot rifles are built with modern technology and steels, enabling them to fire modern smokeless cartridges; the currently popular cartridges of .17 Remington, .243 Winchester, and .30-06 Springfield were offered with standard rubber recoil pads and straight butt plates. However, four of those Limited Series Model 1885 SSs were subtitled Traditional Hunters. Those four rifles, in calibers .38-55 Winchester, .405 Winchester, .45-70 Government, and .45-90 Sharps, were built in the style of the 19th century, with crescent steel butt plates and 19th-century style folding tang sights, along with full octagon 28-inch-long barrels. Their rifling, in the case of the .38-55, are the (Winchester) traditional one complete turn within eighteen inches (1-18") with rifle grooves at .376, and rifle lands measuring .368 of an inch. The .45-70 is by far the most readily available of these four vintage cartridges.

== Modern cartridge advantages ==
The overall length of a Model 1885 with a 28-inch barrel is the same basic length as a Winchester bolt-action Model 70 with a 24-inch barrel. With a longer barrel, bullet velocities can be significantly increased over bolt-action rifles that have the same overall length, provided the proper combination of bullet and propellant is selected.

== See also ==
- Falling-block
- List of Winchester models
- Single-shot
- Winchester Repeating Arms Company
- Winchester Rifle

== Sources ==
1. Kelver, Gerald O. Major Ned H. Roberts and the Schuetzen Rifle. 1998. Pioneer Press
