= Winchester Model 1886 =

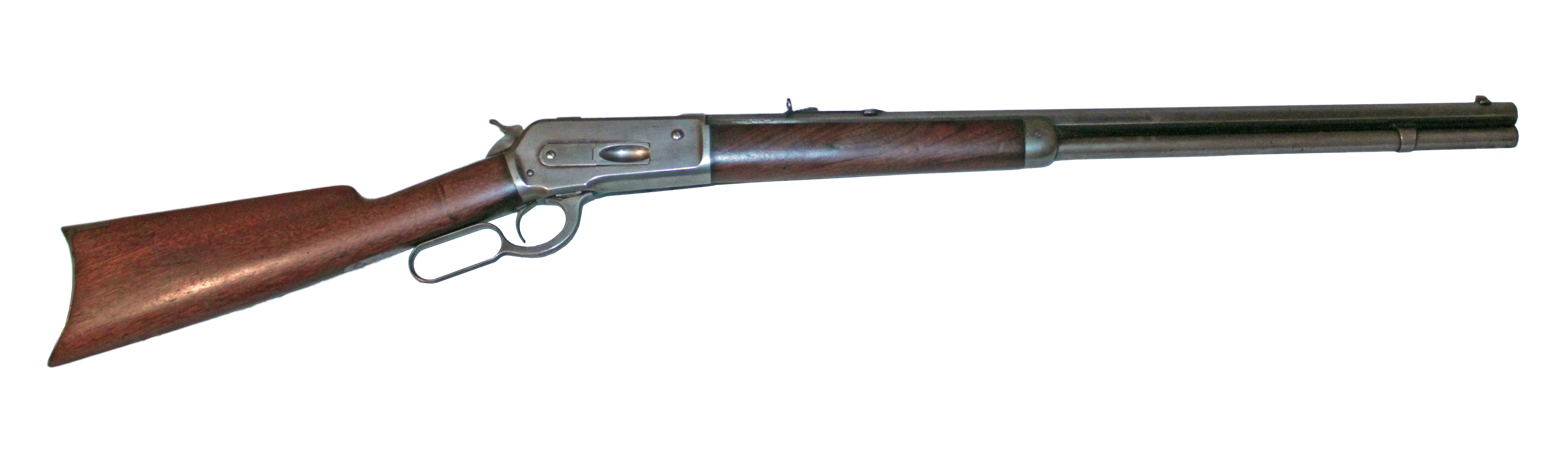
- Winchester Model 1886
- Type: Lever-action rifle
- Place of origin: United States

Service history
- Used by: Cowboys, Hunters
- Wars: Spanish-American War, World War I

Production history
- Designer: John Browning
- Manufacturer: Winchester Repeating Arms Company
- Produced: 1886–1935, 1986–present
- No. built: ~160,000 (prior to 1935)

Specifications
- Mass: 9 lb (4.1 kg)
- Length: 44.5 in (1,130 mm)
- Barrel length: 20 in (510 mm), 22 in (560 mm), 24 in (610 mm), 26 in (660 mm), 28 in (710 mm)
- Cartridge: .45-70 Government, .45-90 Sharps, .40-82 WCF, .40-65 Winchester, .38-56 WCF, .50-110 Winchester, .40-70 WCF, .38-70 WCF, .33 WCF, 32-Gauge
- Action: Lever-action
- Feed system: 7-, 8-, or -9 round tubular magazine
- Sights: Graduated rear sights, fixed-post front sights

The Winchester Model 1886 was a lever-action repeating rifle designed by John Browning to handle some of the more powerful cartridges of the period. Originally chambered in .45-70 Government, .45-90 Sharps, and .40-82 Winchester, it was later offered in a half dozen other large cartridges, including the .50-110 Winchester. Despite being originally designed for use with black powder, the action was strong enough to make the jump to smokeless powder with only minor modifications, and was subsequently chambered in the smokeless .33 Winchester cartridge beginning in 1903.

== History ==
The Model 1886 continued the trend towards chambering heavier rounds, and had an all-new and considerably stronger locking-block action than the toggle-link Model 1876.

It was designed by John Moses Browning, who had a long and profitable relationship with Winchester from the 1880s to the early 1900s. William Mason also contributed, making some improvements to Browning's original design.

In many respects the Model 1886 was a true American express rifle, as it could be chambered in the more powerful black powder cartridges of the day, proving capable of handling not only the .45-70, but also .45-90 and the .50-110 Express "buffalo" cartridges.

The action was strong enough that a nickel-steel barrel was the only necessary modification needed to work with smokeless powder cartridges, and in 1903 the rifle was chambered for the smokeless high-velocity .33 WCF cartridge.

During the early stages of World War I, the Royal Flying Corps purchased Model 1886 rifles chambered for the .45-90 Sharps cartridge with special incendiary bullets designed to ignite the hydrogen gas in German airships.

In 1935, Winchester replaced the M1886 with a slightly modified version dubbed the Model 71, chambered for the more powerful .348 Winchester cartridge.

Soon after the introduction of the Model 1886, Browning designed a scaled-down version of the 1886 action for smaller dual-use or carbine cartridges, which was issued as the highly successful Winchester Model 1892.

The 1886 was offered, on a custom basis, in the rare 32-Gauge shotshell. These rifles were especially chambered, and barreled for the 32-Gauge shotshell.

In 1986, Browning Arms Company contracted with Miroku to produce a limited edition commemorative series of the 1886, and the rifle became a regular part of their catalog in 1992. FN Herstal (which owns both Browning and Winchester brands) returned the 1886 to the Winchester lineup in 2020. Pedersoli, Uberti and Chiappa also make modern reproductions.

== In popular culture ==
In the 2004 video game Half-Life 2, a Model 1886 rifle named "Annabelle" is famously wielded by the character Father Grigori as his signature weapon. However, the version seen in the game is chambered in .357 Magnum, a cartridge the Model 1886 is not built to fire.

== See also ==
- Winchester Repeating Arms Company
- Winchester Rifle
