= .33 Winchester =

Rifle cartridge

.33 Winchester Center Fire
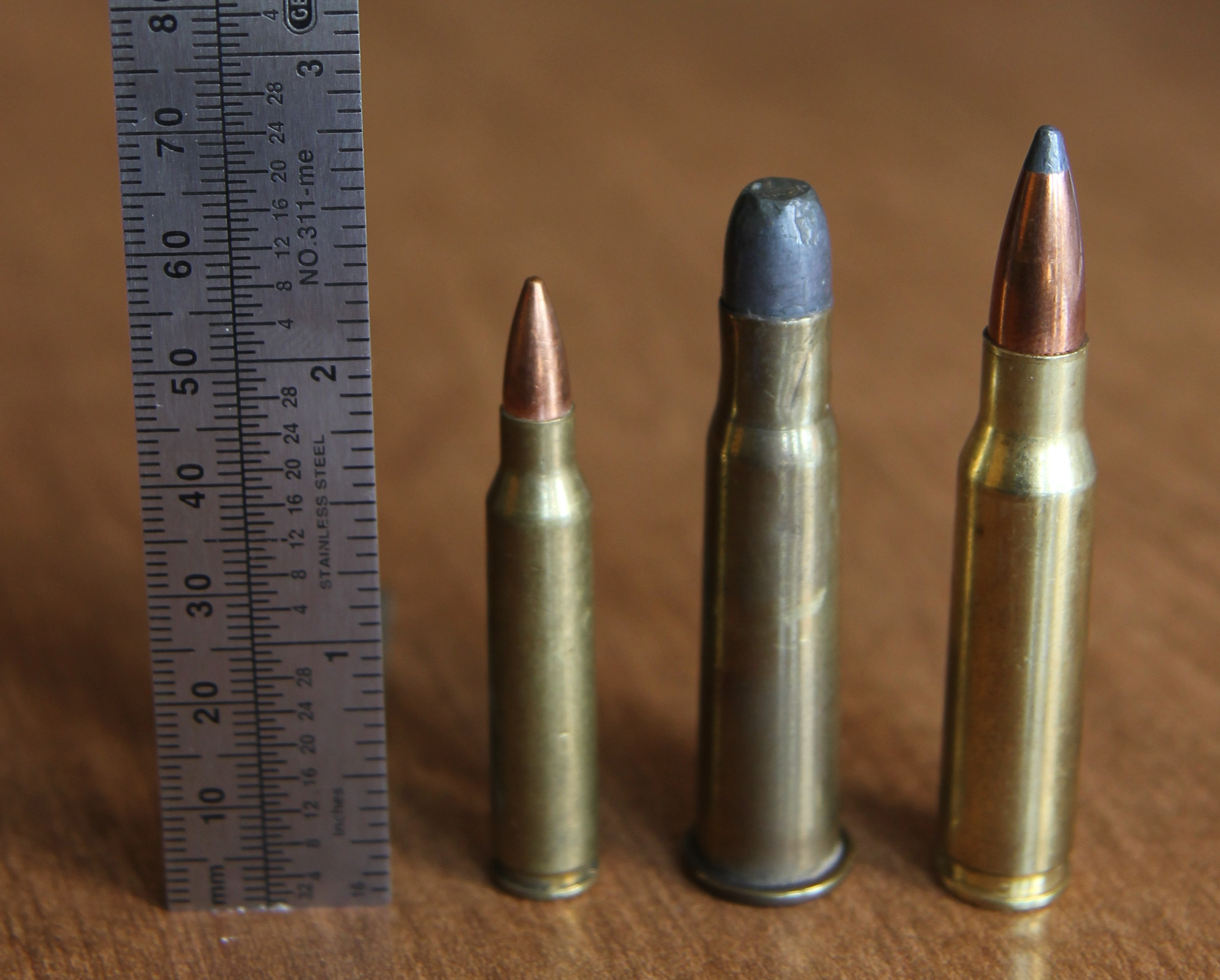
- .33 Winchester Center Fire (center) with .223 Rem (left) and .308 Win (right).
- Type: Rifle
- Place of origin: United States

Production history
- Designed: 1902
- Produced: 1902–1940

Specifications
- Parent case: .45-70
- Case type: Rimmed, bottleneck
- Bullet diameter: .338 in (8.6 mm)
- Neck diameter: .365 in (9.3 mm)
- Shoulder diameter: .443 in (11.3 mm)
- Base diameter: .508 in (12.9 mm)
- Rim diameter: .610 in (15.5 mm)
- Case length: 2.11 in (54 mm)
- Overall length: 2.80 in (71 mm)
- Primer type: large rifle

Ballistic performance
Bullet mass/type	Velocity	Energy
200 gr (13 g) (factory load)	2,200 ft/s (670 m/s)	2,150 ft⋅lbf (2,920 J)
200 gr (13 g) (maximum load)	2,420 ft/s (740 m/s)	2,608 ft⋅lbf (3,536 J)
- Sources: Barnes & Amber 1972

The .33 Winchester Center Fire / 8.6x54mmR (colloquially .33 Winchester, .33 WCF, or .33 Win) is a centerfire rifle cartridge designed and produced from 1902 to 1940 by Winchester Repeating Arms Company for their Model 1886 lever-action rifle.

== History ==
With the new Model 1886 lever-action rifle, and appearance of new smokeless powders on the market, in 1891, Winchester Repeating Arms Company started to experiment with necking down the .45-70 cartridge. The first attempt, a .31-62 with a 200-grain bullet, reportedly resulted in pressures too high for the action. Only a decade later, the desired result was achieved with a new caliber when the .33 Winchester was introduced in 1902. Never popular due to lack of range despite high muzzle velocity (the 1886's tube magazine ensured that aerodynamic pointed-tip bullets couldn't be used except while single loading), the only other firearms offered in this chambering were the Winchester Model 1885 and Marlin Model 1895. The round was eventually replaced by the .348 Winchester in 1936, and ultimately discontinued by Winchester in 1940, although it is still currently produced in small numbers by other ammunition manufacturers.

== Use ==
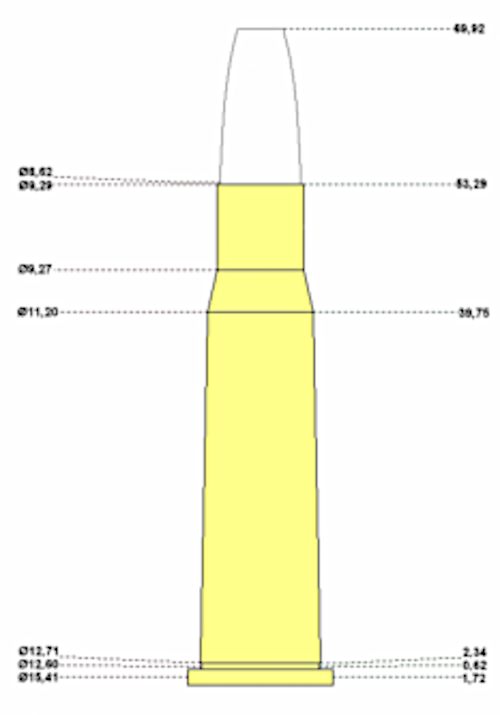
Dimensions of the .33 Winchester

A good round for deer, elk, or black bear in wooded terrain at medium range; it outperforms the ballistically similar .35 Remington and can be improved with modern powders.

== See also ==
- 8mm caliber
- List of cartridges by caliber
- List of rifle cartridges
- List of rimmed cartridges
- List of Winchester Center Fire cartridges

== Bibliography ==
- Barnes, Frank C., ed. by John T. Amber. ".33 Winchester", in Cartridges of the World, pp. 83, 122, & 123. Northfield, IL: DBI Books, 1972. ISBN 0-695-80326-3.
