= Winchester Model 71 =

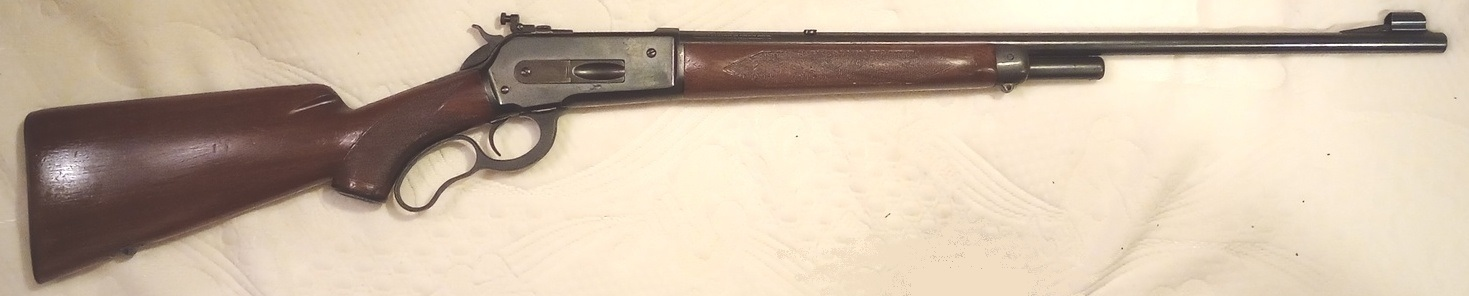
- Type: Lever-action rifle
- Place of origin: United States

Production history
- Manufacturer: Winchester, Browning
- Produced: Winchester: 1935 to 1958, Browning: 1987 (limited edition)

Specifications
- Cartridge: .348 Winchester
- Action: Lever-action

The Winchester Model 71 was a lever-action rifle introduced in 1935 and discontinued in 1958.

== Description ==
A slightly modified version of the Browning designed Winchester Model 1886, it was only chambered for the .348 Winchester round; except for an extremely rare .45-70 Government and .33 WCF. It was also (other than 400 rifles chambered for the .348 in the Cimarron 1885 Hi-Wall in 2005-06) the only firearm that ever used that cartridge. The Model 71 was conceived as a replacement for both the Model 1886 and Model 1895 as a complement to the Winchester Model 70 bolt-action rifle and to replace a raft of cartridges (the .33 Winchester, the .45-70, the .35 Winchester, and the .405 Winchester) with just one (the .348 Winchester). The rifle and cartridge were very effective against any North American big game in heavy timber, including the great bears, if using the 250-grain (16 g) bullet. It was once very popular for hunting in Canada and Alaska.

The rifle was expensive, and with less costly lever action rifles available in common and fairly powerful rounds such as .35 Remington.

Cartridges of the World remarks that factory ammunition was available in 150, 200 and 250-grain (16 g) weights. Only the 200-grain (13 g) weight is still available in factory ammunition.

Browning re-issued the Model 71 as a limited edition in the mid 1980s. The Winchester and Browning versions showed very high degrees of craftsmanship.

As of August, 2013, the Winchester Repeating Arms website again lists model 71s as available, new from the factory.

The Winchester Model 71 is used by enthusiasts and serves as a platform for various wildcat projects.

== Sources ==
- The Cody Firearms Museum research office
- Barnes, F, Cartridges of the World
- Madis, George, The Winchester Book. Houson: Arts and Leisure Press, 1971.
