= .45-90 Sharps =

Rifle cartridge

- Type: Rifle
- Place of origin: United States

Production history
- Designed: 1877
- Manufacturer: Sharps Rifle Manufacturing Company

Ballistic performance
| Bullet mass/type | Velocity | Energy |
|---|---|---|
| 400 gr (26 g) | 1,300 ft/s (400 m/s) | 1,501 ft⋅lbf (2,035 J) |

The .45-90 Sharps, also known as the .45-2 4/10" Sharps, is a black powder rifle cartridge introduced in 1877 by the Sharps Rifle Manufacturing Company and was developed for hunting and long range target shooting. In the modern day, it is used for Black Powder Cartridge Rifle competitions.

While various bullet weights were used, a typical load for the .45-90 was a powder charge 90 grains (5.8 g) gunpowder (black powder) with a bullet weighing 400 grains (26 g). Such a load would have had a muzzle velocity of around 1,300 ft/s (400 m/s).

== .45-90 Express ==
The .45-90 Express is a modern adaptation of .45-90 Sharps which uses the same 2.4 inch case, but uses smokeless powder loaded to pressures up to 45,000 psi. With a 26-inch barrel the .45-90 Express is capable of over 4,200 ft-lbs (5694 J) muzzle energy.

Many modern nitro-proofed single shot or break barrel .45-70 rifles can be easily reamed by a competent do-it-yourselfer to shoot .45-90 Express. These rifles include the Ruger No. 1, New England Firearms Buffalo Classic, and the Pedersoli Kodiak Mark IV. When used in modern repeating firearm such as a converted Marlin 1895, Enfield, or Winchester 1886 the cartridge overall length of the .45-90 Express needs be kept to under 2.85 inches to reliably cycle through the action.

The .45-90 Express is well suited for hunting the largest predators including lion, grizzly, and polar bears, as well as moose, cape buffalo, bison, and elk. Although it could be considered overkill for the application, the .45-90 Express is very effective for deer hunting.

== See also ==
- List of rifle cartridges
