= Winchester Model 67 =

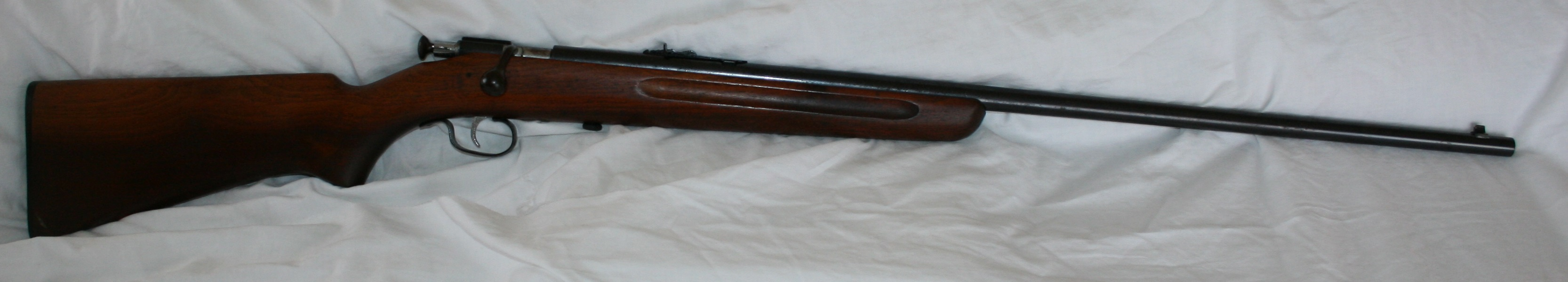
- Early Winchester Model 67 (finger grooves, non-flush takedown screw)
- Type: Rifle
- Place of origin: United States

Production history
- Manufacturer: Winchester Repeating Arms Company
- Unit cost: US$5.50 (1934, retail); US$18.95 (1960, retail)
- Produced: 1934–1960
- No. built: c.383,597–652,538
- Variants: Model 68 target rifle, Boy's Rifle, smoothbore, miniature target bore, Model 677

Specifications
- Mass: About 5.0 lb (2.3 kg) (standard model), 4.5 lb (2.0 kg) (Boy's Rifle), 5.2 lb (2.4 kg) (miniature target bore)
- Barrel length: 27 in (690 mm) (standard model and smooth bore), 20 in (510 mm) (Boy's Rifle), 24 in (610 mm) (miniature target bore)
- Cartridge: .22 Short, .22 Long, or .22 Long Rifle interchangeably (standard); .22 WRF (1935–onwards, optional);. 22 Long Rifle shot cartridge (1940-onwards, miniature target bore)
- Action: Bolt-action
- Feed system: Single-shot
- Sights: U-notch rear sight, beaded-post front sight (early) or Buckhorn rear sight, post front sight (standard), aperture rear sight, hooded post front sight (1943–onwards, optional), shotgun-style bead front sight (1940–onwards, miniature target bore)

The Winchester Model 67 was a single-shot, bolt-action .22 caliber rimfire rifle sold from 1934 to 1963 by Winchester Repeating Arms Company. Based on the earlier Model 60, the Model 67 was the mainstay of Winchester's inexpensive single-shot rifle lineup. A rare variant, the Model 677, was produced with telescopic sights and no provisions for iron sights.

== Origins and design ==
Due to intense competition for entry-level single-shot rifle buyers, Winchester embarked on a program in the early 1930s to reduce the production costs of the entry-level Model 60, which was itself a reduced-cost version of the earlier Model 1904. As with the Model 60 from which it was derived, the cocking piece at the rear of the bolt had to be manually drawn rearwards to cock the action after closing the bolt, but the design was improved to incorporate a wing-style safety. The Model 60 had a similar rotating safety but those Model 60 guns having the "SAFE" and "FIRE" indications were read through oblong holes in the bolt; the wing safety made the safe/fire condition more readily apparent from a distance. The rotating, winged style safety was similar in operation to that found on the then-standard military rifle, the M1903 Springfield.

The Model 67 had a 27-inch (690 mm) barrel with a beaded front sight and a U-notch rear sight (adjustable for elevation), both dovetailed into the barrel, drift-adjustable for windage. Other versions had a simple post front sight and a buckhorn rear sight that was drift-adjustable for windage. When it was first introduced, the rifle could chamber .22 Short, .22 Long, or .22 Long Rifle cartridges interchangeably. The rifle featured a stock made of plain uncheckered walnut with a pistol grip and finger grooves, and was a takedown design; the barreled action was easily removed by turning a screw under the stock using a penny (first-year models had a knurled thumbscrew that could easily be loosed by fingers). A composition buttplate was used.

Several variants of the Model 67 were produced.

=== Model 68 ===
The Model 68 was conceived as a replacement for the slow-selling Model 60A Target model which was designed for the competition market. The Model 68 was basically a Model 67 with a hooded front sight and an aperture rear sight. The Model 68 was effectively rendered redundant when its special sights became optional on the Model 67 in August 1943, but the rifle was not actually discontinued until 1944, and deliveries from inventory continued into 1945.

=== Boy's Rifle ===
In August 1937, acting on a suggestion by Adolph Topperwein, Winchester introduced a smaller version intended to be marketed as a child's first rifle. This barrel was shortened to 20 inches (510 mm), the length of the stock was reduced by 1.19 inches (30 mm), and its weight was 4.5 pounds (2.0 kg), 0.5 pounds (0.2 kg) lighter than the standard model. This model was known as the Junior Model or, perhaps more popularly, the Boy's Rifle.

=== Smoothbore ===
In September 1937, a smoothbore (Garden Gun) version intended for short-range varmint control was introduced, chambered for .22 Short, .22 Long, or .22 Long Rifle snake shot cartridges interchangeably. Other than the absence of rifling, it was largely similar to the standard model.

=== Telescopic sights and Model 677 ===
Winchester-branded telescopic sights were first offered in January 1937 with the introduction of the Model 677. This model featured integral scope bases mounted on the barrel and no provisions for iron sights. Options were a 2¾-power scope or a 5-power scope with crosshairs; a 2¾-power scope with a vertical aiming post was added in November of the same year. The scopes were boxed separately and attached to integral bases on the barrel by the rifle's buyer. Other than the scope and the absence of iron sights, the Model 677 was identical to the Model 67, and various design changes were made in parallel with its parent.

Also in November 1937, the same three scope options became available for the standard model, and the post scope was offered on the Boy's Rifle. Open sights were retained and could be viewed through special split scope bases.

All telescopic sights were formally dropped in 1942 when supplies of optical glass were diverted to meet World War II arms production demands. Production of the Model 677 had actually ceased in 1938 due to very poor sales. The Model 677 has the lowest production total of any Winchester single-shot rimfire model with only 1,400 produced.

=== Miniature target bore ===
In April 1940, Winchester introduced a special smoothbore version chambered for the .22 Long Rifle shot cartridge, featuring a 24-inch (610 mm) barrel and bead sights identical to those used on the Model 12 shotgun.

== Production ==
The Model 67 was introduced alongside the Model 68 in May 1934 and immediately proved popular. As with other Winchester models, various design changes were made over time.

- The finger grooves in the stock were eliminated in late 1935.
- The bolt retaining spring was eliminated in August 1937.
- The stock was enlarged in October 1937 so the takedown screw would fit flush with the bottom, the forearm was changed to a semi-beavertail shape, and the pistol grip was made more pronounced.
- The sear and extractor were modified in January 1938 to throw ejected cases farther when the bolt was opened.
- An optional .22 WRF chambering was added in April 1938 to the standard rifle.
- The same sights used on the Model 68 were offered as options for the Model 67 starting in August 1943.
- In an effort to render Winchester products more visible when stored vertically on retailers' racks, an inlaid bronze stylized "W" logo was added to the trigger guard in March 1944. The logo was changed to red paint at an unknown later date.
- In place of the earlier chrome plating, blued finish was used on the bolt, trigger, and cocking piece starting in October 1944.
- The firing pin design was changed in January 1946.

Sources: Houze 1993, p. 160 & Henshaw 1993, pp. 104–105.

Approximately 383,597 to 652,538 Model 67s had been produced when production ceased in 1963. The Model 67 was never produced with serial numbers for the American market because they were not required on American firearms prior to the Gun Control Act of 1968, but an unknown number bound for foreign markets had serial numbers applied.

Prices of the Model 67 on today's collector market remain reasonable due to the model's high production numbers, with an NRA Good condition Model 67A valued around $250 in March 2022. The Boy's Rifle commands a slight premium, while the relatively rare .22 WRF and smoothbore versions are worth more than double the standard rifle, and the very rare Model 677 is worth nearly ten times standard value.
