= Winchester Model 670 =

- Type: Rifle
- Place of origin: United States

Production history
- Manufacturer: Winchester Repeating Arms Company
- Unit cost: Sporting Rifle $119.95 (1967); Magnum Rifle $134.95 (1967); Carbine $114.95 (1967)
- Produced: 1966-1979
- No. built: 287,648
- Variants: see article

Specifications
- Mass: 6.75–7.25 lbs
- Barrel length: 19, 22 or 24 inch
- Cartridge: .225 Winchester; .243 Winchester; .264 Winchester Magnum; .270 Winchester; 7mm Remington Magnum; .308 Winchester; .30-06 Springfield; .300 Winchester Magnum
- Action: Bolt action
- Feed system: Internal spring fed well with floorplate: 3-round capacity (Magnum Rifle); 4-round capacity (Sporting Rifle and Carbine)
- Sights: Open adjustable rear and bead on front ramp (removable for scope mounting)

The Winchester Model 670 is a bolt-action sporting rifle. Designed as a more affordable version of the Winchester Model 70. Built in three versions; Sporting Rifle, Magnum Rifle, and Carbine. It was produced from 1966 to 1979 except for 1974 when it was not listed by Winchester.

Serial numbers start at 100,000 and are located on the front-right side of the receiver.

== Sporting Rifle ==
Built from 1966 to 1979. The barrel length was 22" and had a weight of 7lbs. The Sporting Rifle was originally offered in .225 Winchester, .243 Winchester, .270 Winchester, .308 Winchester, and the .30-06 Springfield.

In 1969 the 308 Win. was dropped from production, and by 1970 only the 243 Win, 270 Win, and 30-06 Sprg were offered.

Again in 1971 chamberings were reduced to only the 243 Win and 30-06 Sprg.

In 1972 the rifle was redesigned to incorporate the same design stock and a 2 position safety similar to that of the Model 70. The safety only had 2 positions, instead of the 3 of the Model 70.

In 1979 the rifle was discontinued.

== Magnum Rifle ==
Built from 1966 to 1970. The barrel length was 24" and the weight was 7.25lbs. The Magnum Rifle was originally offered in .264 Winchester Magnum, and .300 Winchester Magnum.

In 1967 the 7 mm Remington Magnum was added to the available chamberings.

In 1969 the 7mm Remington Magnum was dropped from production.

In 1970 the Magnum Rifle was dropped from the Model 670 lineup entirely.

== Carbine Rifle ==
Built from 1966 to 1970. The barrel length was 19" and the weight was 6.75lbs. The Carbine Rifle was originally offered in .243 Winchester, .270 Winchester, and .30-06 Springfield.

== See also ==
- Table of handgun and rifle cartridges
- Winchester Repeating Arms Company
- Winchester rifle
