= Winchester Model 68 =

- Type: Rifle
- Place of origin: United States

Production history
- Manufacturer: Winchester Repeating Arms Company
- Unit cost: US$6.35 (1934, retail); US$8.15 (1945, retail)
- Produced: 1934–1944
- No. built: c.98,496–100,730

Specifications
- Mass: 5 lb (2 kg)
- Barrel length: 27 in (690 mm)
- Cartridge: .22 Short, .22 Long, or .22 Long Rifle interchangeably (standard); .22 WRF (1938-onwards, optional)
- Action: Bolt-action
- Feed system: Single-shot
- Sights: Aperture rear sight, hooded post front sight

The Winchester Model 68 was a single-shot, bolt-action .22 caliber rimfire rifle sold from 1934 to 1945 by Winchester Repeating Arms Company. While almost identical to the slightly cheaper Winchester Model 67, it offered an aperture sight.

== Origins and design ==
The early 1930s were a period of intense competition amongst American rifle manufacturers such including Winchester, Iver Johnson, and Mossberg. In an attempt to win the loyalty of entry-level single-shot rimfire rifle buyers, these companies continuously cut production costs and pared profits down to the bare minimum. Winchester already offered a single-shot rimfire rifle aimed at the competition market, the Model 60A, but it had failed to win significant market share due to its relatively high price and was considered a sales disappointment.

Winchester had already embarked on a program to reduce the production costs of the entry-level Model 60, resulting in the new Model 67, and the design of a similar lower-priced target rifle was a logical next step. As with the Model 60 from which they were derived, the cocking piece at the rear of the bolt had to be manually drawn rearwards to cock the action after closing the bolt, but the new rifles featured a wing-style safety with more easily visible "SAFE" and "FIRE" indications. The front sight of the Model 68 was a Model 97A with a removable sheetmetal hood and the rear sight was a Model 96A, featuring a removable disc, which had a smaller aperture better suited for target shooting. With the insert removed, the sight was less accurate but offered more light — making it better for small game hunting and informal plinking. Both rifles featured a stock made of plain uncheckered walnut with a pistol grip and finger grooves, and both were takedown designs; the barreled action was easily removed by turning a screw under the stock using a penny.

== Production ==
The Model 68 was introduced alongside the Model 67 in May 1934 and both rifles immediately proved popular. The Model 68's sales rapidly outpaced the more expensive but slightly better-equipped Model 60A, which was still being sold from inventory, although production had been placed on hiatus in April 1934. The Model 68's sales eventually undercut the Model 60A to such an extent that production of the latter was never resumed.

Production changes to the Model 68 generally paralleled the Model 67. The finger grooves in the stock were omitted starting in mid-1935, the bolt retaining spring was eliminated in August 1937, and the sear and extractor were modified in January 1938 to throw ejected cases farther when the bolt was opened. An optional .22 WRF chambering was added in April 1938, somewhat later than its 1935 introduction on the Model 67.

Winchester-branded telescopic sights were first offered in 1937. Options were a 2¾-power scope with crosshairs or a vertical aiming post and a 5-power scope with crosshairs. Open sights were retained; the scopes were boxed separately and attached to integral bases on the barrel by the rifle's buyer. The telescopic-sight options were discontinued in 1939.

In August 1943, Winchester management decided to offer the same peep sights used on the Model 68 as options for the Model 67, effectively rendering the Model 68 redundant, although it was not formally discontinued until September 1944. Sales from inventory continued into 1945 and the rifle was listed in the 1946 price list although stocks had already been depleted. Approximately 98,496 to 100,730 Model 68s were produced. The Model 68 was not produced with serial numbers, which were not required on rifles or shotguns made or imported to the United States prior to the Gun Control Act of 1968.

Prices of the Model 68 on today's collector market are comparable to the Model 67, but the relatively rare .22 WRF chambering triples the values of the rifle, a larger premium than the same chambering commands on the Model 67.

== Bibliography ==
1. Henshaw, Thomas, The History of Winchester Firearms 1866-1992 6th Ed. Clinton, NJ, USA: New Win Publishing, Inc. 1993. ISBN 0-8329-0503-8.
2. Houze, Herbert G. To the dreams of youth: Winchester .22 Caliber Single Shot Rifle. Iola, WI, USA: Krause Publications, Inc. 1993. ISBN 0-87341-237-0
3. "COLLECTORS CORNER: Collecting the Bolt-Action Winchester .22 Rifle" http://www.ogca.com/boltaction22rifle.htm
4. Fjestad, S.P., Blue Book of Gun Values 30th Ed. Minneapolis, MN, USA: Blue Book Publications, Inc. 2009. ISBN 1-886768-87-0.
