= Winchester Model 37 =

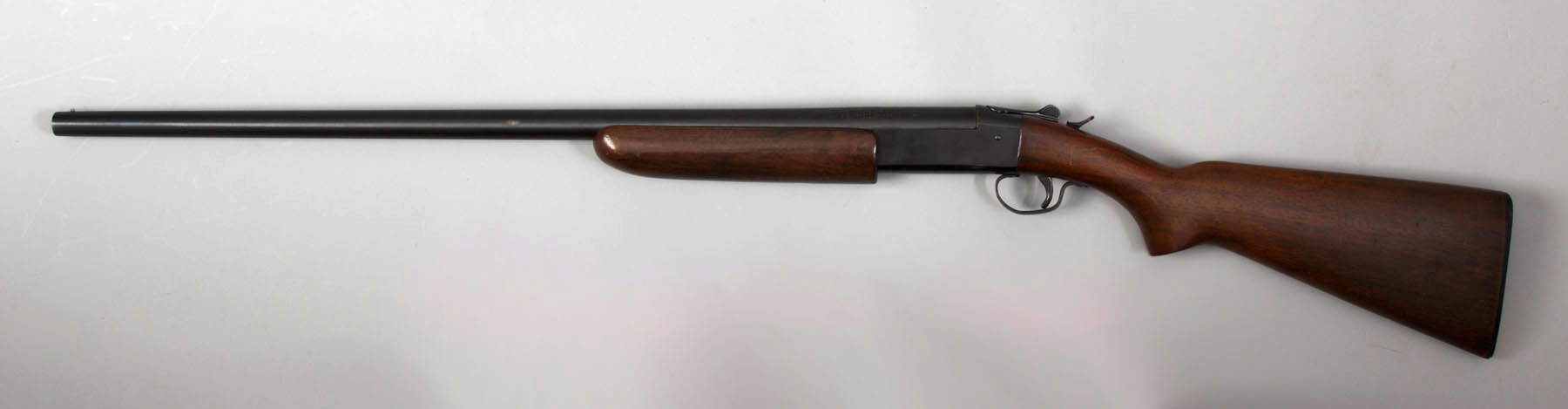
- Type: Shotgun
- Place of origin: United States

Service history
- Used by: US National Guard
- Wars: World War II

Production history
- Designer: Winchester
- Designed: Circa
- Manufacturer: Winchester Repeating Arms Company
- Produced: 1936–1963
- No. built: 1,015,554
- Variants: Model 37, Model 37A

Specifications
- Mass: 6 lbs. (2.7 kg)
- Length: Various
- Barrel length: Various
- Caliber: 12-gauge, 16-gauge, 20-gauge, 28-gauge, and 410-gauge
- Action: Break-action
- Feed system: Single Round
- Sights: Front Bead

The Winchester Model 37 (M37) Single Shot Shotgun is an American firearm. It was in production from 1936 to 1963, with 1,015,554 units made. This model was developed by Winchester with a standard visible hammer action for many years. The Winchester Model 37 uses a top-cocking lever, breakdown type of action with an automatic shell ejector. The first M37 shotguns were delivered on February 10, 1936, according to factory records. M37 shotguns were not serial numbered.

== Technical specifications ==
The M37 came in two styles, Standard and Boy's Model (introduced 1958). Modified choke or cylinder bore was furnished at no extra charge on special order only. The M37 was chambered in the following gauges and shells respectively: 12, 16, 20, 28, and 410 using 2 3/4-inch, 2 7/8-inch, 3-inch shells. The M37 unit weight was between 5 3/4 and 6 lbs; the fluctuation was dependent on the chambered gauge.

== History ==
During World War II, the US National Guard used Winchester Model 37 12-gauge shotguns.

== Production ==
This shotgun was based on concepts patented by Winchester designers William Roemer and Edwin Pugsley (U.S. Patents #2,125,956 and #2,137,808 respectively). Pugsley's idea was especially important: instead of a casting or a forging, the frame (or receiver) was made primarily from heavy-duty stampings, which reduced production costs while still providing ample strength.

Production changes included the folded sheet metal "pigtail" omission in the second year of production to a solid steel construction. The 410 gauge production started in the second year (1937). Early Winchester models referred to as "Red Letter" shotguns were stamped with the Winchester name and filled with red custom enamel paint until 1948. M37's were manufactured without date stamps or serial numbers. There are no factory records for the yearly number of shotguns produced from 1936 to 1963 the entire production run.

Sources: The History of Winchester Firearms 1866-1992 By Thomas Henshaw
