= .348 Winchester =

Rifle cartridge

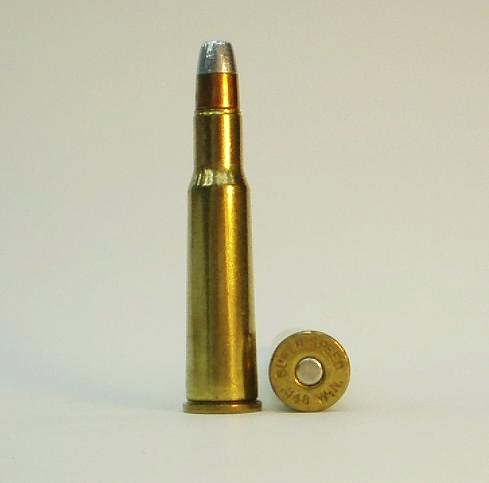
- .348 Winchester
- Type: Rifle
- Place of origin: United States

Production history
- Designer: Winchester
- Produced: 1936–present

Specifications
- Parent case: .50-110 WCF
- Case type: Rimmed, bottleneck
- Bullet diameter: .348 in (8.8 mm)
- Land diameter: .340 in (8.6 mm)
- Neck diameter: .3785 in (9.61 mm)
- Shoulder diameter: .485 in (12.3 mm)
- Base diameter: .553 in (14.0 mm)
- Rim diameter: .610 in (15.5 mm)
- Rim thickness: .070 in (1.8 mm)
- Case length: 2.255 in (57.3 mm)
- Overall length: 2.795 in (71.0 mm)
- Rifling twist: 1 in 12
- Primer type: Large rifle
- Maximum pressure (CIP): 46,000 psi (320 MPa)
- Maximum CUP: 40,000 CUP

Ballistic performance
| Bullet mass/type | Velocity | Energy |
|---|---|---|
| 150 gr (10 g) | 2,890 ft/s (880 m/s) | 2,780 ft⋅lbf (3,770 J) |
| 200 gr (13 g) | 2,530 ft/s (770 m/s) | 2,840 ft⋅lbf (3,850 J) |
| 250 gr (16 g) | 2,350 ft/s (720 m/s) | 3,060 ft⋅lbf (4,150 J) |
| 200 gr FTX | 2,630 ft/s (800 m/s) | 3,072 ft⋅lbf (4,165 J) |
- Test barrel length: 24

The .348 Winchester / 8.8x57mmR is an American rifle cartridge. It was introduced in 1936, and developed for the Winchester Model 71 lever action rifle. The .348 was one of the most powerful rimmed rounds ever used in a lever action rifle.

In May 2026, the Ruger No. 1 was chambered in .348 Winchester.

== Performance ==
It is often used for North American big game in woods or brush, if the 250 grain bullet is used, but not especially suited to long range (400 yards and beyond) as a result of the need to use flat-nose bullets due to the Model 71's tubular magazine. Using Hornady's FTX flex tip pointed bullets, 300 yards with a good peep sight is a fairly easy shot (Factory-loaded, midrange trajectory at 200 yards (180 m) is 2.9 in (7.4 cm) for the 150-grain (9.7 g) bullet, 3.6 in (9.1 cm) for the 200-grain (13 g) round, and 4.4 in (11 cm) for the 250-grain (16 g) slug.) The 200-and-250-grain (13 and 16 g) loadings are preferred for anything past 100 yd (91 m).

In 1962, Winchester dropped the factory 150 gr and 250 gr loads, retaining only the 200 gr. No other rifle was ever offered in .348 by Winchester (although Uberti has made some 400 rifles chambered for the .348 in the Cimarron 1885 Hi-Wall in the mid-2000s), and it has been supplanted by the .358 Winchester (in the Model 88). (The Model 71 was discontinued in 1958.)

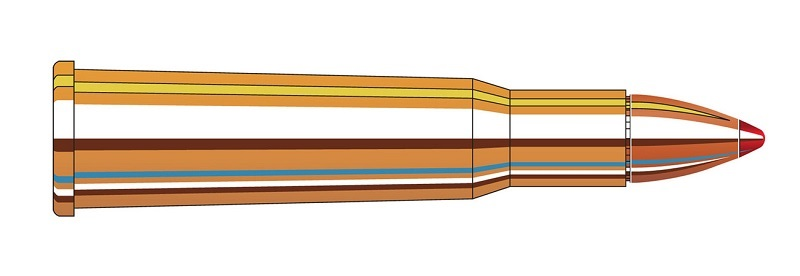
The .348 Winchester cartridge.

In 1987, Browning produced a modern version of the Model 71 in Japan. These have different thread sizes in places, most notably the barrels, and many parts will not interchange with the originals. The Browning version was a limited production model only.

The case of the .348 was used to produce the 8-348w wildcat, used to rechamber World War I-era rifles such as Lebel or Berthier, instead of the original 8x50mmR, which at the time of such conversions were still considered war materiel in France and therefore strictly regulated. The .348 is also the basis for the .348 Ackley Improved, The .348 Ackley improved has about a 200 fps advantage over the standard pushing the 200 grain FTX bullet at 2800 feet a second with some of the new hybrid powders. The .348 also served as the basis for the .50 Alaskan and .500 Linebaugh cartridges.

== Dimensions ==
SAAMI rates the standard pressure of the cartridge at 40,000 CUP. The C.I.P rates the max standard pressure at a "Pmax = 3200 bar" or 46,412 psi.

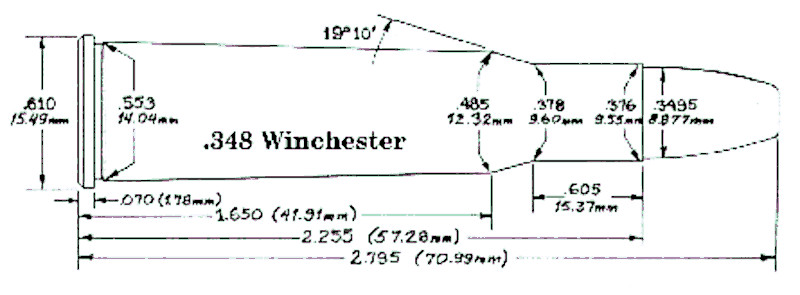

== See also ==
- List of cartridges by caliber
- List of rimmed cartridges
- List of rifle cartridges
- Table of handgun and rifle cartridges
- 9mm caliber
- .35 Remington
- .360 Buckhammer
