= Farquharson rifle =

Farquharson Rifle
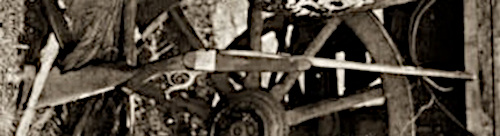
- Type: Rifle
- Place of origin: United Kingdom

Production history
- Designer: John Farquharson
- Designed: 1872
- Manufacturer: Gibbs, Jeffery, among many others
- Produced: Gibbs models: 1872–1910; Public Domain "PD" models: 1895–1927

Specifications
- Cartridge: Various
- Action: Falling-block action
- Feed system: 1-round

The Farquharson Rifle is a single-shot hammerless falling-block action rifle designed and patented by John Farquharson (1833–1893), of Daldhu, Scotland in 1872. George Gibbs, a gun maker in Bristol, became a co-owner of the Farquharson patent in 1875 and was the sole maker of Farquharson rifles until the patent expired. Less than 1,000 Gibbs-Farquharson rifles were manufactured; the last rifle was delivered in 1910.

A few years after the original Farquharson patent expired in 1889, many English gun makers began producing their own versions of Farquharson rifles utilizing actions made by Auguste Francotte in Herstal, Belgium. These actions were essentially exact copies of those used by Gibbs to build his military target Farquharson rifles, which had a solid combined lower tang and trigger guard. The actions had "PD" stamped on the receiver, which stood for "public domain," indicating there was no patent infringement in utilizing the design. W. J. Jeffery & Co. produced most of the "PD" Farquharson rifles, with the first ones being sold in 1895 as their Model 95 Falling Block Rifle. In 1904 Jefferey introduced a larger version of this action called the Model 1904 and chambered in the 600 Nitro Express. The Model 95 and Model 1904 were listed in the Jeffery catalogs right up until 1927. However, beginning in 1912 the advertisements for the falling-block rifles carried the notation "Now made to order only, having been superseded by the Magazine Rifle."

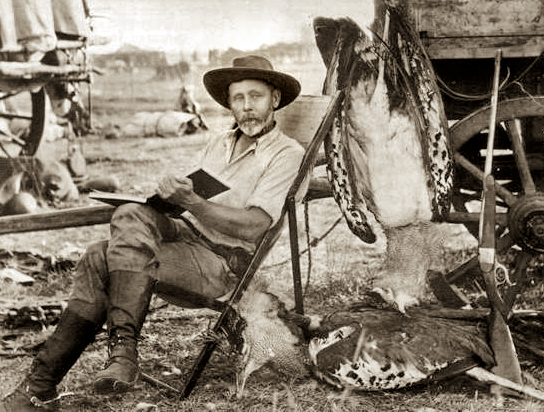
Frederick Courteney Selous, was a British explorer, officer, hunter, and conservationist, famous for his exploits in south and east of Africa. Selous used a .461 Gibbs Farquharson for much of his African hunting. This is a photo of him on African safari, with two shot Kori bustards and his Holland & Holland Woodward patent rifle. Circa 1890s

== Legacy ==
Because of its rarity, the original Gibbs-Farquharson rifles are highly prized collector pieces today. The public domain "PD" Farquharson rifles made by other companies are less rare, but are still generally considered collector pieces rather than working firearms.

Ruger introduced their No.1 single-shot falling-block rifle in 1967, a design loosely styled after the Farquharson rifles, and it remains one of their best selling firearms.

Several other gunmakers offering bespoke single-shot rifles more or less based on the Farquharson, including Soroka Rifle Co. in New Zealand, Dakota Arms Inc. in Sturgis, South Dakota, US and Sturtevant Arms Company in Pueblo, Colorado, US.
