= Falling-block action =

Single-shot firearm action

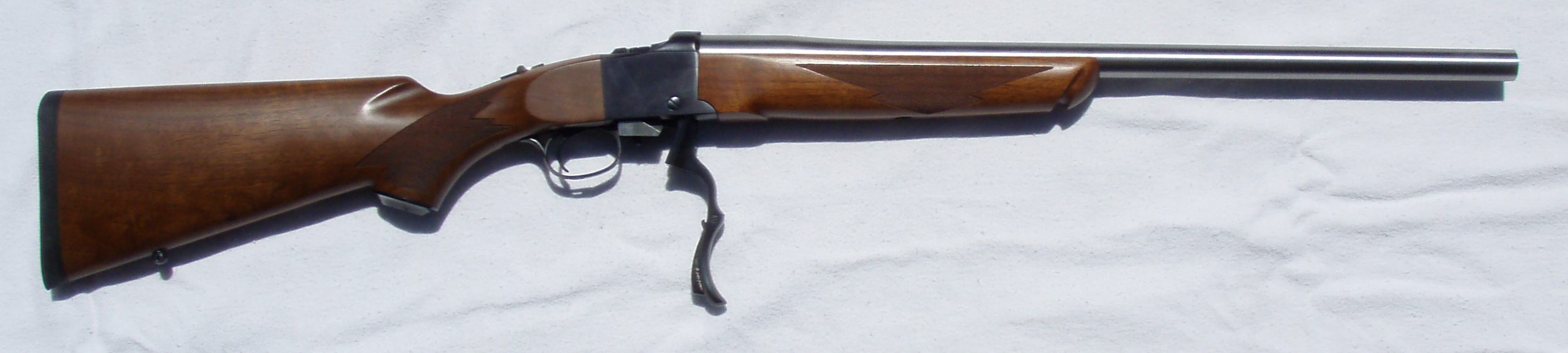
Ruger No. 1 single-shot falling-block rifle in .243 Winchester with custom barrel with action open.

A falling-block action (also known as a sliding-block or dropping-block action) is a single-shot firearm action in which a solid metal breechblock slides vertically in grooves cut into the breech of the weapon and is actuated by a lever.

== Description ==
Sliding (falling) block action.

When the breechblock is in the closed (top) position, it seals the chamber from the high pressures created when the cartridge fires and safely transfers the recoil to the action and stock. When the breechblock is in the opened (bottom) position, the rear (breech) end of the chamber is exposed to allow ejection or extraction of the fired case and reloading of an unfired cartridge. It is a very strong action; when the breech is closed, the receiver essentially becomes a single piece of steel (as opposed to other actions that rely on lugs to lock the breech). This type of action is used on artillery pieces, as well as small arms. An additional advantage is the unobstructed loading path, which imposes no limit on the overall length of a cartridge; this was very significant in the mid to late 19th century period with the use of very long "buffalo" and "express" big-game cartridges.

Rifles using this action include the M1870 Belgian Comblain, M1872 Mylonas, Sharps rifle, Farquharson rifle, 1890 Stevens, Sharps-Borchardt Model 1878, Winchester Model 1885, Browning model 1885, Browning M78, the Ruger No. 1, and the Ruger No. 3. Falling-block action military rifles were common in the 19th century. They were replaced for military use by the faster bolt-action rifles, which were typically reloaded from a magazine holding several cartridges. A falling-block breech-loading rifle was patented in Belgium by J. F. Jobard in 1835 using a unique self-contained cartridge. A falling block pistol was also produced in 1847 by the French gunsmith Gastinne Renette who would file another patent in 1853 in France and through the patent agent Auguste Edouard Loradoux Bellford in Britain for the same system only using self-contained metallic centerfire cartridges. Produced in 1865 by gunsmith Daikuhara Tosanosuke in Tosa, Shikoku, the Japanese needle-fire falling-block carbine. This firearm serves as a notable example of the swift integration and localization of Western military technology during Japan’s transitional era following the nation's opening to international relations.

As well as being used for artillery, falling-block action rifles are still manufactured and used for hunting and target shooting. This also includes 8 gauge industrial shotguns for shooting clinkers or slag built up inside industrial boilers or furnaces.

The falling-block action is closely related to that of the Martini–Henry rifle, the Peabody action (similar to, but not identical with, that of the Martini–Henry), the Ballard action, and the Madsen–Rasmussen (uniquely, a repeater), which uses a pivoting rather than a sliding block.

== See also ==
- Bolt-action
- Lever-action
- Pump-action
- Break-action
- Rolling-block
- Semi-automatic rifle
