= Sharps Rifle Manufacturing Company =

Defunct American firearms manufacturer

- Type: Private
- Industry: Firearms
- Founded: October 9, 1851 in Hartford, Connecticut, United States
- Founder: Samuel Robbins and Richard S. Lawrence
- Defunct: 1881
- Fate: Dissolved
- Headquarters: Bridgeport, Connecticut, United States
- Area served: United States
- Key people: John C. Palmer, Christian Sharps, Richard S. Lawrence
- Products: Single-shot rifles

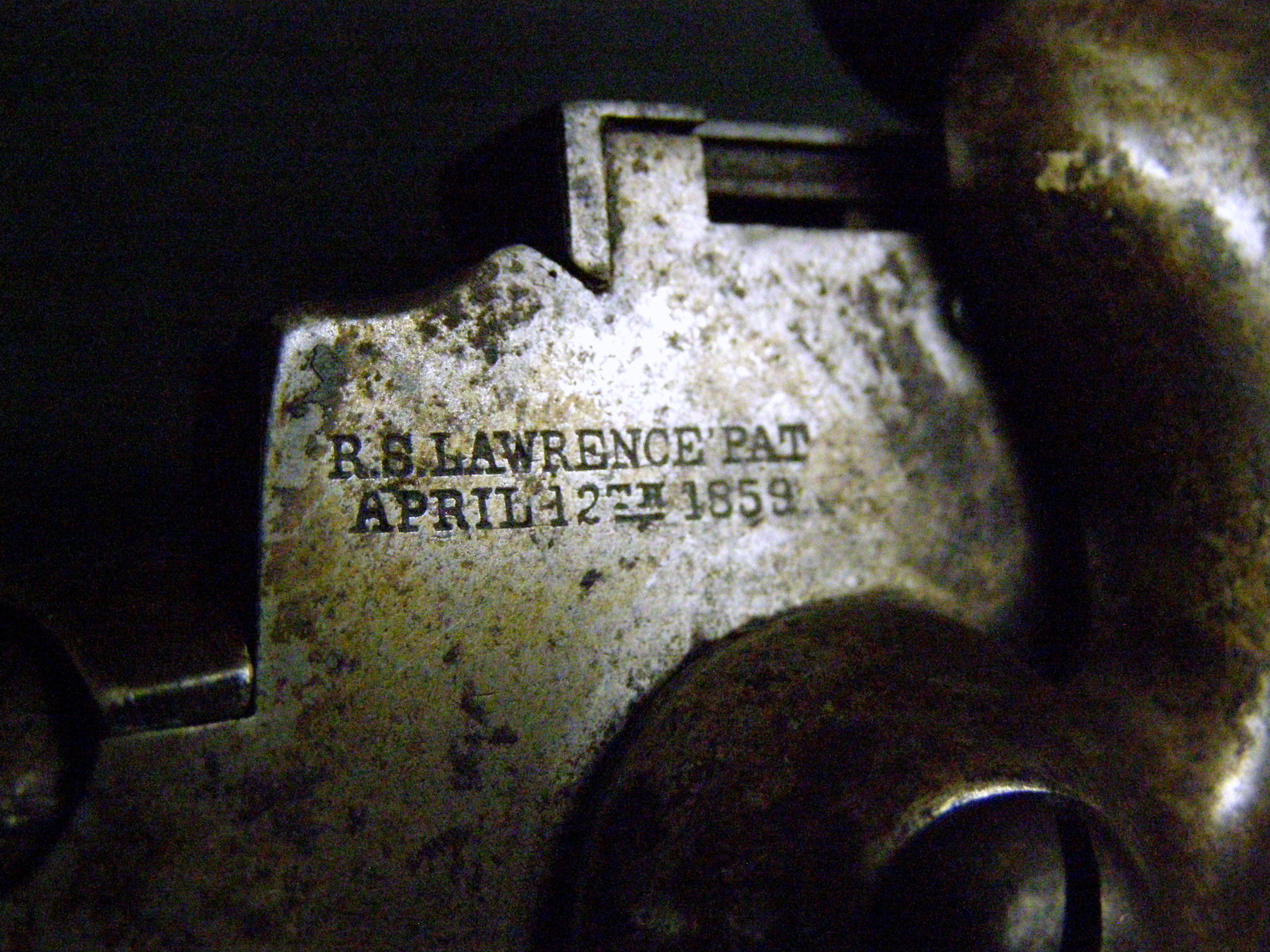
Early tape priming system developed by Richard Lawrence integrated on a Sharp's model 1859 Carbine.

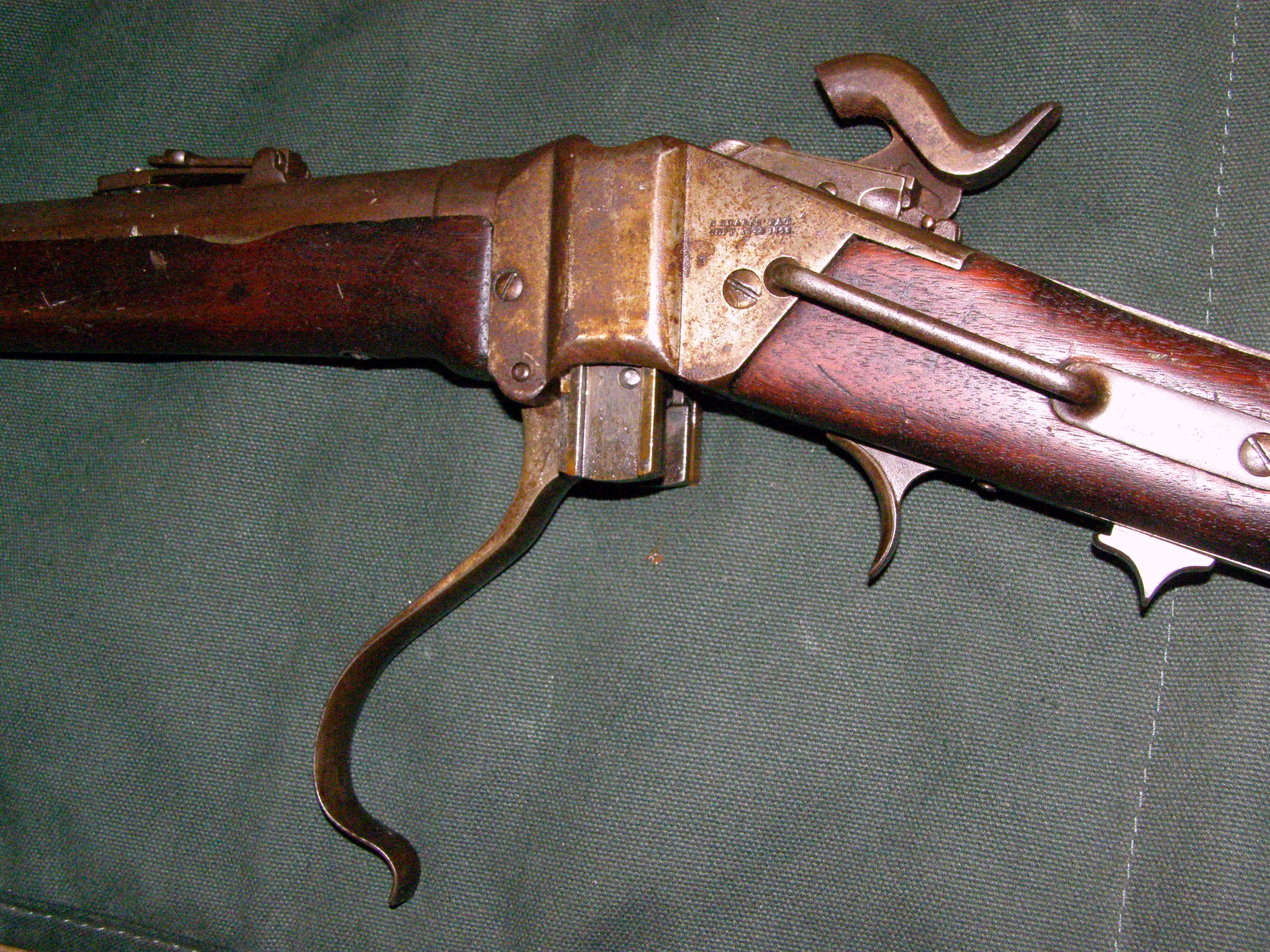
Side view of a Sharps model 1859 carbine with the action open.

Sharps Rifle Manufacturing Company was the manufacturer of the Sharps Rifle. The company was organized by Samuel Robbins and Richard S. Lawrence as a holding company in Hartford, Connecticut, on October 9, 1851 with $100,000 in capital. Despite Sharps departing from the company bearing his name, Sharps Rifle Manufacturing Company produced over 100,000 rifles, but it dissolved in 1881 with the widespread use of repeating rifles.

== History ==
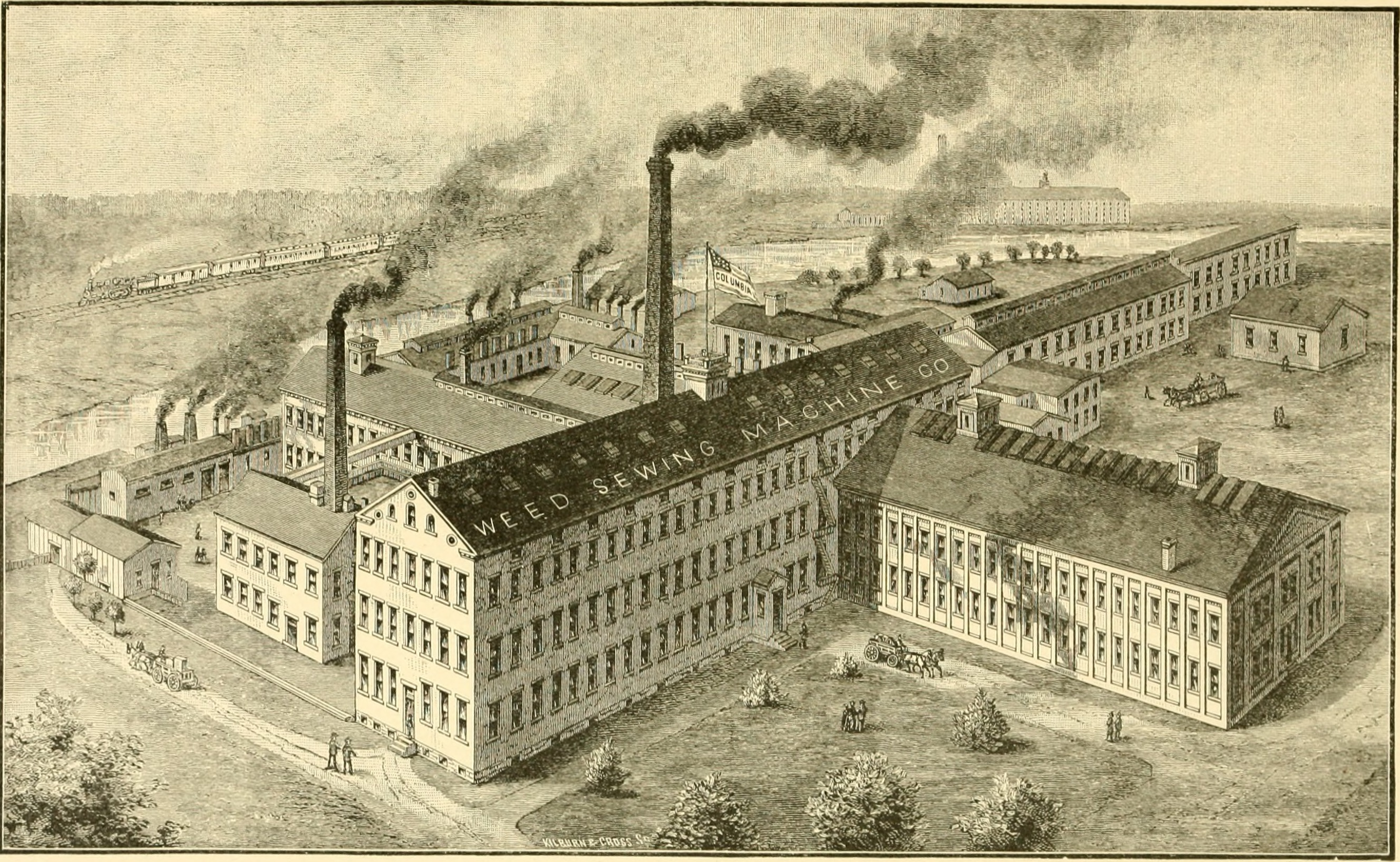
Hartford sewing machine company building that housed Sharps Rifle Co.

Christian Sharps (1810–1874), patented his rifle in 1848. The first contract for 5,000 rifles was in 1850 and manufacturing started in 1851. The Model 1851 "box-lock" was developed by Christian Sharps, Rollin White, and Richard Lawrence at Robbins & Lawrence of Windsor, Vermont. The second contract for 15,000 rifles was so large that no suitable land was available in Windsor, Vermont. The holding company advanced Robbins & Lawrence $40,000 to purchase 25 acres (100,000 m^{2}) of land in Hartford, Connecticut, and to erect a brick factory building.

Christian Sharps left the Company in 1853. He later formed a partnership with William Hankins in 1862, known as Sharps & Hankins. In 1855, manufacturing was moved to Hartford and continued until 1876. Operations were then moved to Bridgeport, Connecticut.

In 1872, Sharps introduced the .50-90 Sharps hunting cartridge. Hugo Borchardt designed the last rifle made by the company, the Sharps-Borchardt Model 1878, but the company went bankrupt and was defunct three years later in 1881.

The Sharps Rifle Manufacturing Company produced over 100,000 firearms during the US Civil War for the Union Army, but the company was plagued by lawsuits and eventually succumbed to a shifting marketplace as repeating rifles became more popular with shooters.

Production	Sharps Model	Type	Caliber
1849 to 1850	Model 1849	Rifle	0.44
1850 to 1850	Model 1850	Rifle	0.44
1852 to 1855	Model 1851	Carbine	.36, .44, .52
1853 to 1855	Model 1852	Rifle	0.52
1853 to 1855	Model 1852	Carbine	0.52
1853 to 1855	Model 1852	Shotgun	Various
1854 to 1857	Model 1853	Carbine	Various
1856 to 1857	Model 1855		0.52
1856 to 1857	Model 1855	U.S. Navy Rifle	0.52
1855 to 1857	Model 1855	British Carbine	0.52
1859 to 1866	Model 1859	Carbine	0.52
1859 to 1866	Model 1863	Carbine	0.52
1859 to 1866	Model 1865	Carbine	0.52
1859 to 1866	Model 1859	Rifle	0.52
1869 to 1871	Model 1869	Carbine	0.52
1869 to 1871	Model 1869	Military Rifle	0.50-70
1869 to 1871	Model 1869	Sporting Rifle	.44-77, .50-70
1871 to 1880	Model 1874		Various
1877 to 1878	Model 1877		0.45
1878 to 1881	Model 1878		Various

== Legacy ==
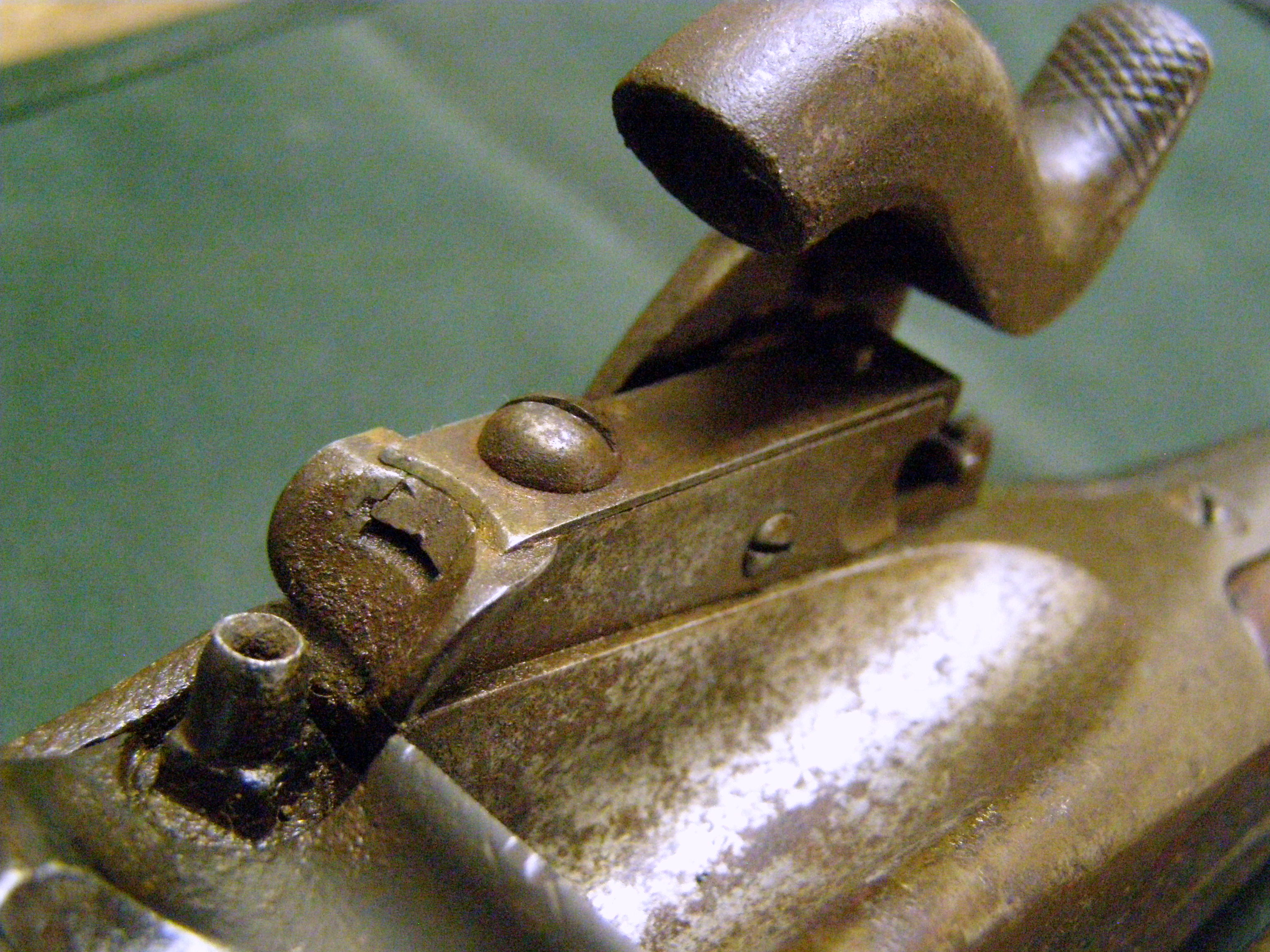
Left side view of Lawrence priming system integrated on a Sharps Model 1859 carbine.

The building of the defunct company was occupied in 1883 by Annsville Wire Mills, which moved out from Annsville, New York after a fire, and later by a typewriter company.

Reproductions of the paper cartridge Sharps 1863 Rifle, the metallic cartridge 1874 Sharps Rifle, and Sharps-Borchardt Model 1878 are manufactured today for use in hunting and target shooting. A number of companies, among them Shiloh Rifle Manufacturing Company and C. Sharps Arms Co. Inc., both of Big Timber, Montana, and the Italian gunmaker Davide Pedersoli & Co. of Brescia, offer a line of Sharps reproductions.

The Sharps Rifle Manufacturing Company had manufactured bicycles under contract for Weed Sewing Machine Company in Hartford. When Sharps relocated to Bridgeport, the Weed Sewing Machine Company bought the old Hartford plant to manufacture bicycles themselves.
