= Ruger No. 1 =

Single-shot rifle

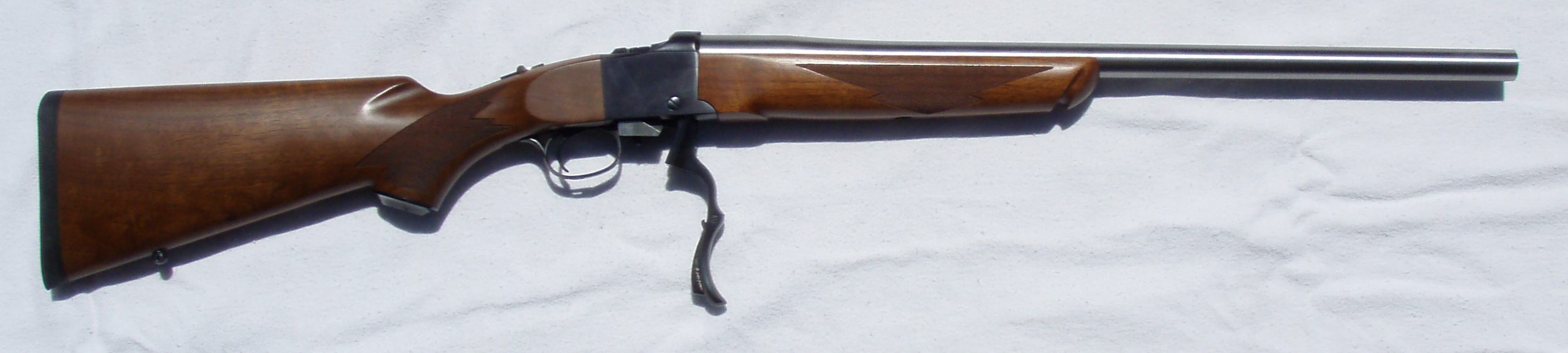
- Ruger No. 1 rifle (with underlever down to open action)
- Type: Falling block rifle
- Place of origin: United States

Production history
- Designer: Bill Ruger
- Designed: 1966
- Manufacturer: Sturm, Ruger & Co., Inc.
- Unit cost: $1,299 (2012)
- Produced: 1967–2013 (original production); 2014–present (limited production)
- Variants: Standard, Varminter, Light Sporter, International, Tropical, Medium Sporter.

Specifications
- Mass: 6–12 pounds (2.7–5.4 kg)
- Length: 36.5–42.5 inches (93–108 cm)
- Barrel length: 20–28 inches (51–71 cm)
- Cartridge: Various (see article)
- Action: Farquharson-style Hammerless falling block
- Feed system: Single shot
- Sights: none, or open sights

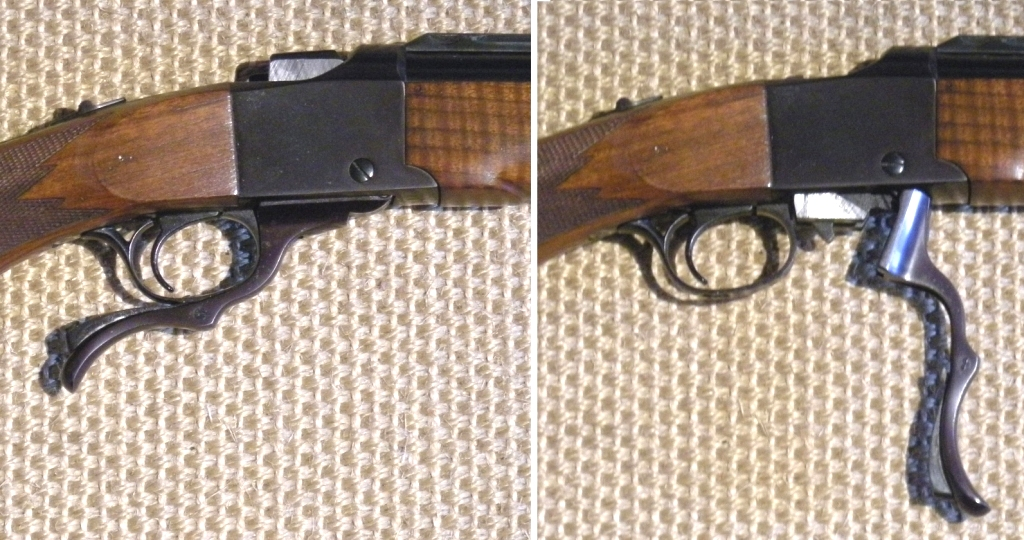
Sturm, Ruger No. 1 falling block action

The Ruger No. 1 is a single-shot rifle introduced and manufactured by Sturm, Ruger & Co. since 1967. it is designed with a Farquharson-style hammerless falling-block action, where an underlever lowers the breechblock to expose the chamber and allow cartridge loading, and closing the lever sets the rifle in battery and also cocks the hammer. A shotgun-style tang safety secures the hammer and sear.

The Ruger No. 1 is available with an Alexander Henry, Beavertail or Mannlicher-style forearm. The rifles came in several sub-models: 1A, 1AB, 1B, 1H, 1S, 1V and RSI(K designation refers to Stainless with laminated stocks). The No. 1 also comes with barrel lengths ranging from 20 to 28 in (510 to 710 mm) and in a multitude of calibers. Lenard Brownell, commenting on his work at Ruger, said of the No. 1: "There was never any question about the strength of the action. I remember, in testing it, how much trouble I had trying to tear it up. In fact, I never did manage to blow one apart."

== Available cartridges ==
Over the years, the No. 1 has been chambered in many different cartridges, including:

- .204 Ruger
- .218 Bee
- .22 Hornet
- .22 PPC
- .22-250 Remington
- .220 Swift
- .222 Remington
- .223 Remington
- 6mm PPC
- 6mm Remington
- .243 Winchester
- .25-06 Remington
- .250 Savage
- .257 Roberts
- .257 Weatherby Magnum
- 6.5mm Remington
- 6.5×55mm
- 6.5 PRC
- 6.5-284 Norma
- 6.5 Creedmoor
- .264 Winchester Magnum
- .270 Winchester
- .270 Weatherby Magnum
- .275 Rigby
- 7×57mm
- 7mm-08
- 7mm PRC
- 7mm Remington Magnum
- 7mm STW (Shooting Times Westerner)
- .280 Remington
- .280 AI
- 7.62x39mm
- .30-30 Winchester
- .30-40 Krag
- .30-06 Springfield
- .300 Winchester Magnum
- .300 H&H Magnum
- .300 PRC
- .300 RCM
- .300 Weatherby Magnum
- .303 British
- .308 Winchester
- .338 RCM
- .338 Federal
- .338 Winchester Magnum
- .348 Winchester
- .35 Remington
- .35 Whelen
- .357 Magnum
- 9.3×62mm
- 9.3×74mmR
- .375 H&H Magnum
- .375 Ruger
- .375 Winchester
- .38-55 Winchester
- .404 Jeffery
- .405 Winchester
- .416 Remington Magnum
- .416 Ruger
- .416 Rigby
- .44 Remington Magnum
- .45-70 Government
- .450 Bushmaster
- .450 Marlin
- .450 Nitro Express
- .450/400 Nitro Express
- .454 Casull
- .458 Winchester Magnum
- .458 Lott
- .460 G&A (Guns & Ammo)
- .460 S&W Magnum
- .475 Linebaugh
- .475 Turnbull
- .480 Ruger

== See also ==
- List of firearms
- Table of handgun and rifle cartridges
