= Single-shot =

Firearm that holds one round of ammunition

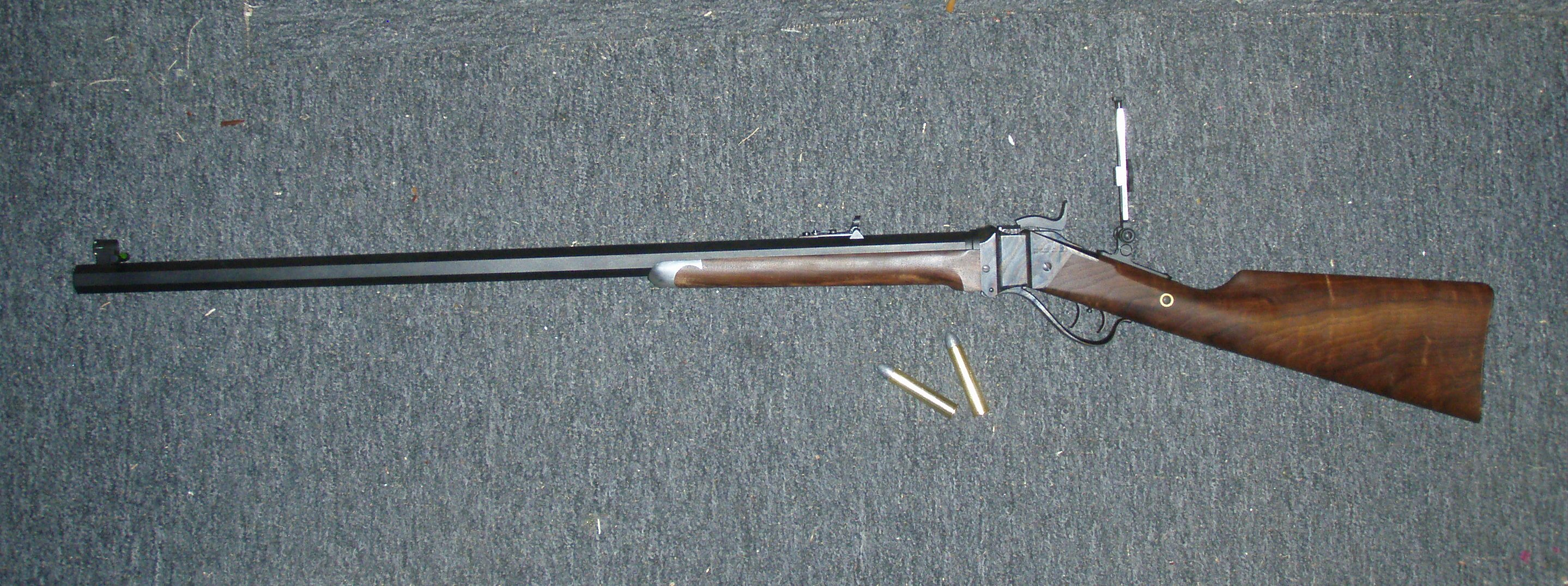
Shiloh Sharps Model 1874 Hartford in .50-90 Sharps

In firearm designs, the term single-shot refers to guns that can hold only a single round of ammunition inside and thus must be reloaded manually after every shot. Compared to multi-shot repeating firearms ("repeaters"), single-shot designs have no moving parts other than the trigger, hammer/firing pin or frizzen, and therefore do not need a sizable receiver behind the barrel to accommodate a moving action, making them far less complex and more robust than revolvers or magazine/belt-fed firearms, but also with much slower rates of fire.

The history of firearms began with muzzleloading single-shot firearms such as the hand cannon and arquebus, then multi-barreled designs such as the derringer appeared, and eventually many centuries passed before breechloading repeating firearms became commonplace. Although largely disappeared from military usage due to insufficient firepower, single-shot firearms are still produced by many manufacturers in both muzzleloading and cartridge-firing varieties, from zip guns and ultra-concealable pocket pistols to the highest-quality hunting and match rifles.

== History ==
=== Pre-cartridge era ===
The vast majority of firearms before the introduction of metallic cartridges from the 1860s onwards were single shot muzzleloaders . However, multi-barrel, breechloading, revolving, and other multi-shot firearms had been experimented with for centuries. Notable pre-cartridge era single-shot firearms included matchlock, wheellock, snaplock, doglock, miquelet lock, flintlock, and percussion cap firearms. Muzzleloaders included the Brown Bess, Charleville and Springfield Model 1861 muskets, the Kentucky and Mississippi rifles, and the duelling pistol. There were also early breech-loading single-shot rifles, such as those manufactured by Hall, Ferguson, and Sharps.

=== Cartridge era ===
==== Rifles ====
Almost all of the early cartridge-fed rifles were single-shot designs, taking advantage of the strength and simplicity of single-shot actions. A good example is the "trapdoor" or Allin action used in early cartridge conversions of 1863 Springfield muzzleloading rifles. The conversion consisted of filing out (or later milling out) the rear of the barrel, and attaching a folding bolt, the "trapdoor", that flipped up and forwards to allow the cartridge to be loaded in the breech. Once loaded, the bolt was closed and latched in place, holding the round securely in place. The bolt contained a firing pin that used the existing percussion hammer, so no changes were required to the lock. After firing, the act of opening the bolt would partially extract the fired case from the chamber, allowing it to be removed. In 1866, the United States standardized on the Springfield Model 1866 rifle and .50-70 cartridge, chambered in trapdoor conversions of rifled muskets that had been used in the American Civil War. The trapdoor mechanism continued usage in 1873 with the adoption of the Springfield Model 1873 rifle and .45-70 cartridge. The Springfield Model 1873 rifle stayed in service until 1892 when it was replaced by the Krag–Jørgensen bolt-action rifle from 1892 until 1903.

Another muzzleloader conversion similar in concept to the Allin action was the British Snider–Enfield, also introduced in 1866, which hinged to the side rather than forward. Unlike the US Army, which kept its trapdoors for decades, the British soon moved beyond the Snider to the more sophisticated dropping-block Martini action derived from the Peabody action. Martini–Henrys were the standard British rifles of the late Victorian era, and Martini–Enfield conversions continued in second-line service until the Second World War.

Single-shot rifles were the preferred tools of big-game hunters in the late 19th century. The buffalo hunters of the American West used Sharps, Remington, and Springfield single-shots; ivory and trophy hunters in Africa and Asia used Martini and break-action "express rifles" and "elephant guns." These rifles were designed for very large black-powder cartridges, from military-issue .45-70 on up to the enormous .50-140 Sharps and .500 Express; early repeating actions were not capable of handling rounds of this power and physical size. The single-shot big-game rifle would only be displaced by bolt-action repeaters firing high-velocity smokeless-powder cartridges in the early 20th century.

After the advent of high-powered repeating rifles, single-shot rifles were primarily used for target shooting matches, with the first official match shooting event, opening at Creedmoor, Long Island in 1872. From about 1872 until the U.S. entry into World War I in 1917, target shooting with single-shot rifles was nearly as popular in America as golf is today. During that golden age of match shooting, the most popular target rifles were made by Bullard, Stevens, Remington, Maynard, Ballard, Farrow, and Winchester. Calibers used by some of these rifles during matches ranged from the .25-20 Winchester, .32-40 Winchester, .33 Winchester, .35 Winchester, .38-55 Winchester, .40-50 Winchester, .40-70 Winchester, .44-105 Winchester, etc. for over 600 yd (550 m) shooting at Creedmoor. However, two calibers maintained consistency throughout their tenure during the single-shot era: the .32-40 and the .38-55 calibers. The minimum standard in the beginning of the sport had been 200 yd (180 m) firing from the standing position (off-hand position). No rifle scopes, no bench rests, no prone (lying down on the front) positions, but shooting, as famed rifle barrel maker, Harry Melville Pope (1861–1950), once stated, "standing on his hind legs and shooting like a man." The .32-40 and .38-55 were able to buck the wind better at 200 yd (180 m), and not wear the rifleman out by heavy recoil, all while sustaining great accuracy. In the end, though, it was the .32-40 single-shot rifle that became the dean of match shooters, as the recoil from the .38-55 took its toll after hundreds of rounds had been fired during a match.

In 1878, John Moses Browning patented arguably the greatest single-shot rifle ever produced: after Browning sold his design to the Winchester Repeating Arms Company it was brought out as the Winchester Model 1885 Rifle. Although fewer than 200,000 Model 1885 Single Shots were built, they remained in production from 1885 to 1920.

Remington, Sharps, and Browning all made single-shot rifles using different actions, such as the rolling block and falling block. These rifles were originally chambered in large black-powder cartridges, such as the .50-110 Winchester, and were used for hunting large game, often bison. Later production rifles would be in popular smokeless powder cartridges, such as the .30-40 Krag.

Single-shot rifles co-existed for some time with the lever-action rifle, but they began to fade out of manufacture with the advent of reliable bolt-action rifles.

==== Pistols ====
The handgun began as a single-shot weapon in China in the 14th century. In its many versions, it remained a muzzle-loaded weapon until the advent of the metallic cartridge in the first third of the 18th century. Such single-shot cartridge-firing pistols were short-lived, as revolver technology evolved rapidly, and cartridge conversions existed for the common models of cap and ball revolvers. Two forms of single-shot pistol, however, remained: single-shot derringers, and target pistols, which were essentially single-shot rifle actions cut down to pistol size. The Remington Rolling Block is perhaps the most well-known of these. As the era of single-shot rifles faded, so did these early single-shot pistols.

In 1907, J. Stevens Arms, a maker of inexpensive break-open single-shot rifles in pistol calibers, started making pistol versions of their rifles. This pistol was chambered in .22 Long Rifle and came with adjustable iron sights and grips designed for target shooting. These models were discontinued in 1939.

==== Shotguns ====
Single-barrel shotguns have always been popular as an inexpensive alternative to double-barreled shotguns. They are almost always break-open designs, like the double-barreled designs, but far less expensive since they do not require the precise aligning of parallel barrels. Single-barrel shotguns are also lighter, which can be an advantage if they are carried hunting, though it does mean they have more felt recoil. They are not widely used in shotgun sports, as most events require the ability to quickly fire two successive shots.

The single-barrel shotgun is often referred to as a "kitchen door gun" or a "farm gun" due to its low cost as a self-defense weapon.

== Types of single-shot cartridge actions ==
=== Trapdoor actions ===
The earliest metallic-cartridge breechloaders designed for general military issue began as conversions of muzzle-loading rifle muskets. The upper rear portion of the barrel was filed or milled away and replaced by a hinged breechblock which opened upward to permit loading. An internal angled firing pin allowed the re-use of the rifle's existing side-hammer. The Allin action made by Springfield Arsenal in the US hinged forward; the Snider–Enfield used by the British opened to the side. Whereas the British quickly replaced the Snider with a dropping-block Peabody-style Martini action, the US Army felt the trapdoor action to be adequate and followed its muzzleloader conversions with the new-production Springfield Model 1873, which was the principal longarm of the Indian Wars and was still in service with some units in the Spanish–American War.

Other trapdoor actions include the rare Confederate Tarpley carbine, the Austrian Wanzl, the Belgian Albini-Braendlin rifle and Terssen conversion (some of which were made from French 1777 pattern flintlocks), the M1842/59/67 Swiss Milbank-Amsler, the M1859/67 Spanish Berdan, and the Colt-manufactured Russian Berdan Type I. All of these designs save the 1863 Tarpley date from the period 1865–1869, and all but the Tarpley and the Russian Berdan were conversions from muzzle-loaders.

=== Break actions ===
Perhaps the most common type of single-shot action, usually found in shotguns, small pistols, and black-powder "elephant" guns, a break action connects the barrel assembly to the breechblock with a hinge. When a locking latch is released, the barrel assembly pivots away from the receiver, opening the breech and sometimes on higher quality firearms, partially extracting the spent cartridge.

=== Rolling block actions ===
In a rolling block action, the breechblock takes the form of a part-cylinder, with a pivot pin through its axis. The operator rotates or "rolls" the block to open and close the breech; it is a simple, rugged and reliable design. Rolling blocks are most often associated with firearms made by Remington in the later 19th century; in the Remington action the hammer serves to lock the breech closed at the moment of firing, and the block, in turn, prevents the hammer from falling with the breech open. An interesting variation of the rolling block was the Austrian M1867 Werndl–Holub, in which the pivot pin was parallel to the barrel and the block rotated sideways.

=== Dropping block actions ===
These are actions wherein the breechblock lowers or "drops" into the receiver to open the breech, usually actuated by an underlever. There are two principal types of dropping block: the tilting or pivoting block and the falling or sliding block.

==== Tilting block actions ====
In a tilting or pivoting block action, the breechblock is hinged at the rear (in contrast with tilting bolt, which is not hinged). When the lever is operated, the block tilts down and forward, exposing the chamber. The best-known pivoting block designs are the Peabody, the Peabody–Martini, and Ballard actions.

The original Peabody rifles, manufactured by the Providence Tool Company, used a manually cocked side-hammer. Swiss gunsmith Friedrich Martini devised an action that resembled the Peabody but incorporated a hammerless striker cocked by the operating lever with the same motion that pivoted the block. The 1871 Martini–Henry which replaced the "trapdoor" Snider–Enfield was the standard British Army rifle of the later Victorian era, and the Martini was also a popular action for civilian rifles.

Charles H. Ballard's self-cocking tilting-block action was produced by the Marlin Firearms Company from 1875 and earned a reputation among long-range "Creedmoor" target shooters. Surviving Marlin Ballards are highly prized by collectors, especially those mounted in the elaborate Swiss-style Schützen stocks of the day.

==== Falling block actions ====
In a falling or sliding block action the block does not pivot but rather slides vertically in a slot milled into the receiver. Falling blocks are among the strongest small-arm actions ever produced, and are also used in heavy artillery. Well-known falling block designs include the Sharps rifles and carbines, the Browning/Winchester Single Shot, the Farquharson rifle, and the modern Ruger No. 1.

=== Bolt-actions ===
Although bolt-actions are usually associated with fixed or detachable box magazines, in fact, the first general-issue military breechloader was a single-shot bolt-action: the paper-cartridge Prussian needle gun of 1841. France countered in 1866 with its superior Chassepot rifle, also a paper-cartridge bolt-action. The first metallic-cartridge bolt-actions in general military service were the Berdan Type II introduced by Russia in 1870, the Mauser Model 1871, and a modified Chassepot, the Gras rifle of 1874; all these were single-shots.

Today most top-level smallbore match rifles are single-shot bolt-actions.

Single-shot bolt-actions in .22 caliber were also widely manufactured as inexpensive "boys' guns" in the earlier 20th century; and there have been a few single-shot bolt-action shotguns, usually in .410 bore.

=== Other single-shot actions ===
- The Ferguson rifle: British Major Patrick Ferguson designed his rifle, considered to be the first military breechloader, in the 1770s. A plug-shaped breechblock was screw-threaded so that rotating the handle underneath would lower and raise it for loading with ball and powder; the flintlock action still required conventional priming.
- The Hall rifle: The United States' first breechloading cavalry carbine, the Hall was introduced in 1819. The lever tipped the breechblock including the chamber upwards and back, allowing it to be loaded with powder and ball without the inconvenience of loading and ramming from the muzzle. Originally flintlocks, Halls later were made as or converted to percussion locks.
- The Kammerlader: A crank-operated Norwegian firearm produced around the time of the Prussian Needle-gun. Originally used a paper cartridge. Later many were converted to rimfire.
- The Burnside carbine: Invented by future-general Ambrose Burnside in 1857, this percussion-cap carbine became the third-most common cavalry breechloader in the Civil War after the Sharps and Spencer. Essentially a modification of the Hall concept, the Burnside featured a unique conical cartridge with a crushable hollow front rim, designed to seal the breech on closing.
- The Rising breech carbine: An unusual action produced by Bilharz, Hall and Co. for the southern Confederacy, the rising breech's underlever caused the breechblock including the chamber to slide vertically above the line of the barrel, the reverse of a falling-block; the chamber was loaded from the front with a paper cartridge.
- The Morse Carbine: Its action is similar to the Hall rifle but the shape of its chamber is different.
- Winchester Model 55: An unconventional hybrid of a single-shot and a semi-automatic, this .22-caliber rifle ejected the fired case and recocked itself like a conventional blowback-operated self-loader, but it lacked a magazine and had to be manually reloaded for each shot.
- "'Screw Barrel Actions'":

The OSS stinger pen pistol and several other clandestine pen guns, as well as homemade zip guns often made using plumbing parts, and cane guns used for both defense and poaching use a screw thread to attach the chambered barrel to a receiver with some sort of breech and firing pin. The user unscrews the barrel from the receiver to expose the chamber to load a cartridge. The RN50 .50 BMG single-shot rifle uses a similar screwthread breech cap to allow an otherwise simple break-action to contain a .50 BMG cartridge.

== Modern single-shots ==
Although non-cartridge single-shot firearms are still made in hobbyist contexts (for example, replicas of antique guns), this discussion focuses on newer designs employing cartridges.

=== Pistols ===
The modern era of single-shot firearms is most visible in the realm of pistols. Remington introduced the single-shot bolt-action XP-100 pistol in 1963, which heralded the era of high-performance, high-velocity pistols. The .221 Fireball cartridge lived up to its name by reaching velocities of 2,700 ft/s (820 m/s) from a 10.5 in (27 cm) barrel. Essentially a shortened .222 Remington, the compact .221 Fireball delivered accuracy exceeding many rifles, out to ranges unheard of for other handguns.

Even bigger than the XP-100, the 1967 introduction of the Thompson Center Arms Contender pistol changed handgun sports forever. The Contender was a break-open design that allowed barrels to be changed by the shooter in minutes. Available in calibers from .22 Long Rifle up to .45-70, and in barrel lengths of 8 to 14 in (20 to 36 cm), the Contender could, in the right hands, handle any type of game, and delivered rifle-like accuracy to match the XP-100.

Many other manufacturers make single-shot pistols, most based on the bolt-action rifle, with barrels generally ranging from 10 to 15 in (25 to 38 cm). Single-shots dominate handgun metallic silhouette shooting and are the most common type used for hunting.

Single-shot pistols have sometimes found popularity among insurgents, resistance fighters, and street gangs. The mass-produced, low-cost Liberator pistol of World War II, which was manufactured and distributed by U.S. forces to Allied resistance forces and guerrilla fighters as an assassination pistol, is the most common example of a mass-produced single-shot pistol. More than a million units were produced and distributed freely, and many remain in private hands. A few varieties of zip guns could also be considered single-shot pistols. In recent years, these improvised firearms have become more common in the hands of criminals and insurgents, especially when manufactured firearms are difficult to acquire.

=== Rifles ===
==== Ruger ====
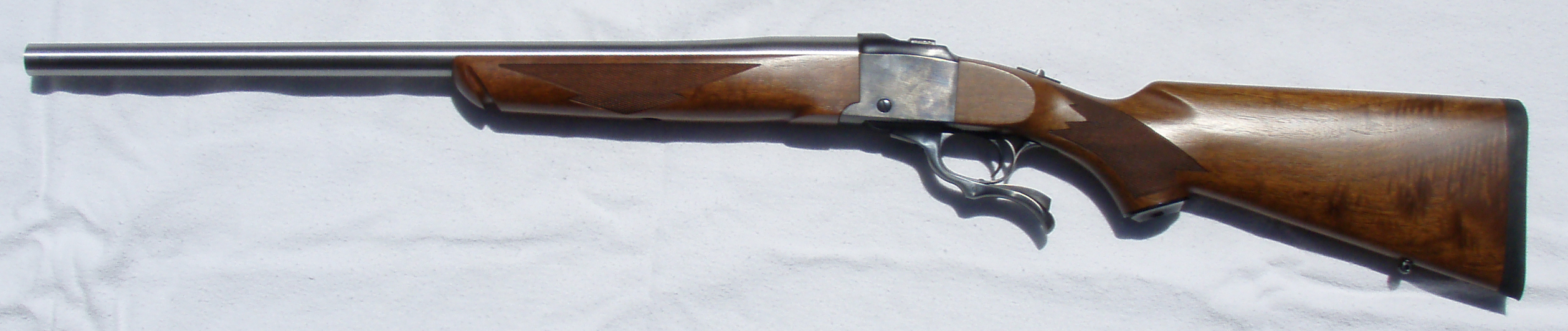
Ruger No. 1 single-shot rifle with custom .243 barrel

In 1966, Sturm, Ruger introduced their first true rifle, Ruger No. 1, which uses a falling-block action and is available in a wide selection of calibers from .22 Hornet to .458 Winchester Magnum. The No. 1 has always been sought after by shooters who appreciate the compact size of a single-shot rifle, and the falling block action cuts about 4 in (10 cm) off the length of the rifle for a given barrel length. From 1972 to 1987, Ruger also made a less expensive version of the #1, the #3. The #3, which sold for about half the price of a #1, used a simplified, non-locking lever for the falling block action, and came with an uncheckered stock.

==== Browning ====
In 1985, Browning re-introduced the famous Winchester Model 1885 single-shot rifles in popular calibers but under the Browning name. Although the rifle gained fame under the Winchester brand name, it was John Moses Browning that designed the rifle, selling the rights to Winchester in the early 1880s and was in production from 1885 to 1920.

==== Cooper ====
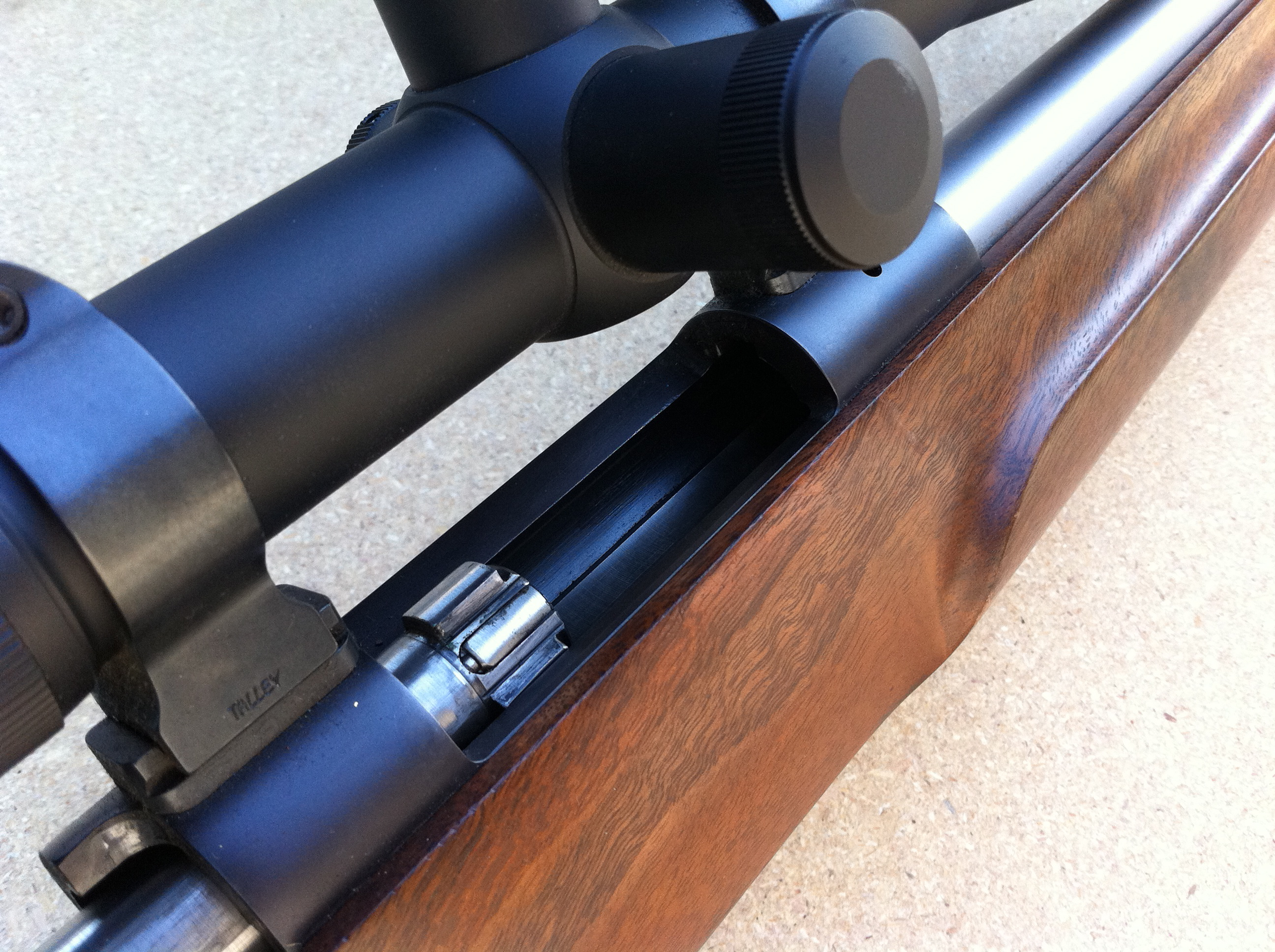
Open action of Cooper Model 22 single-shot rifle

The majority of rifles made by Cooper are single-shot bolt-action rifles. Many of their rifles are specially crafted to suit long-range varmint hunting, where the accuracy of the single-shot action is helpful.

==== Remington ====
Remington has once again made their No. 1 Rolling Block rifles available through their custom shop.

==== New England Firearms (H&R) ====
One of the most common single-action rifles would be the New England Firearms' inexpensive break-open rifles, which are built on their 12 gauge break-open shotgun actions. The rifles, however, are made on a heat-treated steel action, and the shotgun actions are not heat-treated. Any rifle frame may accept rifle or shotgun barrels. The shotgun frames, however, are only safe for shotgun barrels. These were originally built by Harrington & Richardson starting in 1871. H&R was later acquired by NEF, and both are now part of the Marlin Firearms family. Rifles are sold both under the NEF and the H&R names. These rifles are quite accurate, and often less than half the price of a bolt-action rifle in the same caliber.

==== Winchester ====
In 2005, Winchester re-marketed their legendary Model 1885 Single Shot Rifle, under their Limited Series category. The modern calibers of .17 were offered in a Low-Wall design, and the .243 Winchester and .30-06 Springfield were of the High-Wall design. The most faithful of the reproductions are the Traditional Hunter Limited Series Model 1885 Single Shots, as they have the original style steel crescent butt plates, and folding steel tang rear sights, with full-length octagon barrels. The Traditional Hunters are chambered in the 19th-century calibers of .45-90 Sharps, .45-70 Government, .405 Winchester, and .38-55 Winchester. Test firing of some of these Winchesters showed that they are high quality in construction, using the latest technology and modern steel, they are stronger and safer than their 19th-century predecessors, and accuracy from their factory (non-custom) barrels were exceptionally good; especially at 200 yd (180 m).

==== Sharps ====
Sharps rifles were a staple of the buffalo hunters in the late 19th century. Recently, they have had a resurgence in popularity for hunting large game as well as historical firearms events and black-powder cartridge (BPCR) competitions. Much of the current popularity is due to the film Quigley Down Under that featured a Sharps Model 1874 rifle. The popularity of Cowboy action shooting has also affected the availability of single-shot rifles, with many replicas of the old black-powder rifles, particularly the Sharps, now being available.

==== Barrett M99 ====
The Barrett M99 is a single-shot, bolt-action, bullpup sniper rifle. It is chambered in both .50 BMG, and .416 Barrett, a round that has 0.5 MOA accuracy at ranges that greatly exceed one mile.

==== Denel NTW-20 ====
The Denel NTW-20 is a bolt-action, anti-material, or large-caliber sniper rifle. With a buffered slide in the receiver, the barrel can recoil inside the frame, allowing for large rounds to be fired with relative ease by the user. It is chambered for 20×82mm Mauser, 14.5×114mm, and 20×110mm Hispano-Suiza round. Specifically, it is only a single-shot when chambered to the 20mm Hispano-Suiza round, while the remaining chamberings fed from 3-round magazines.

==== Steyr ====
The original version of the Steyr HS .50 is a single-shot bolt-action sniper rifle. It is chambered in .50 BMG (or .460 Steyr) and can reach ranges from 1,500 to 2,500 m (1,600 to 2,700 yd).

== See also ==
- Multiple-barrel firearm
- H & R Firearms
- Rolling block
- Ruger No. 1
- Sharps Rifle
- Thompson Center Arms
- Martini–Henry
- Martini Cadet
- Semi-automatic firearm
- Repeating firearm
