= Winchester Model 52 =

Winchester Model 52 rifle
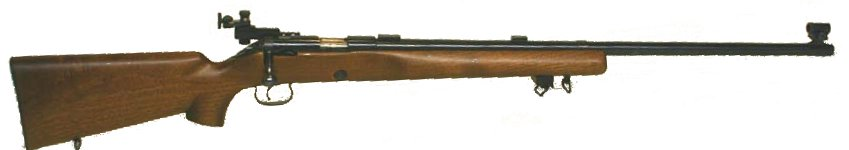
- 1954 Winchester Model 52C
- Type: Rifle
- Place of origin: United States

Production history
- Designer: T.C. Johnson, Frank Burton, A. F. Laudensack
- Designed: 1918-19
- Manufacturer: Winchester Repeating Arms Company
- Produced: 1920-1980
- No. built: 125,419
- Variants: Sporting Model, International Match

Specifications
- Mass: 9 lb (4.1 kg) to 13 lb (5.9 kg) target; 7.25 lb (3.3 kg) sporter
- Length: 45 in (1,100 mm) target; 41 in (1,000 mm) sporter
- Barrel length: 28 in (710 mm) target; 24 in (610 mm) sporter
- Cartridge: .22 Long Rifle
- Action: Bolt-action
- Feed system: 5 round/10 round box magazine
- Sights: Micrometer ladder rear sights, fixed-post front sights standard; many custom iron and optical combinations

The Winchester Model 52 is a bolt-action .22-caliber target rifle introduced by the Winchester Repeating Arms Company in 1920. For many years it was the premier smallbore match rifle in the United States, if not the world. Known as the "King of the .22s", the Model 52 Sporter was ranked by Field & Stream as one of "the 50 best guns ever made" and described by Winchester historian Herbert Houze as "perfection in design". However, by the 1970s the World War I-era design was showing its age and had given way in top-level competition to newer match rifles from Walther and Anschütz; the costly-to-produce Model 52, which had long been a loss leader prestige product by that time, was finally discontinued when US Repeating Arms took over the manufacture of Winchester rifles from Olin Corporation in 1980.

== Origins ==
During World War I, Winchester's management determined that production of the Model 1885 Single Shot would not be resumed in centerfire chamberings after the war, nor in .22 rimfire (the "Winder musket") after existing Army training rifle contracts were fulfilled or cancelled. A new .22 would therefore be needed for the then very popular sport of target shooting; Winchester reasoned that returning soldiers would be drawn to the bolt action design with which they had become familiar. The rifle to be designated the Model 52 was designed from the ground up as an "accuracy rifle" — the world's first production .22 to be so conceived. It was initially hoped that the Army could be persuaded to buy a bolt-action smallbore training rifle in addition to-or in place of-its existing contracts for Model 1885s. Yet despite the outward appearance of its early versions, the Model 52 was never a military rifle, as the Army only purchased 500 of the initial production for trial, and never placed a bulk order. (Note: Ultimately the Army elected to produce a .22-caliber version of the '03 Springfield, the M1922)

== Development ==
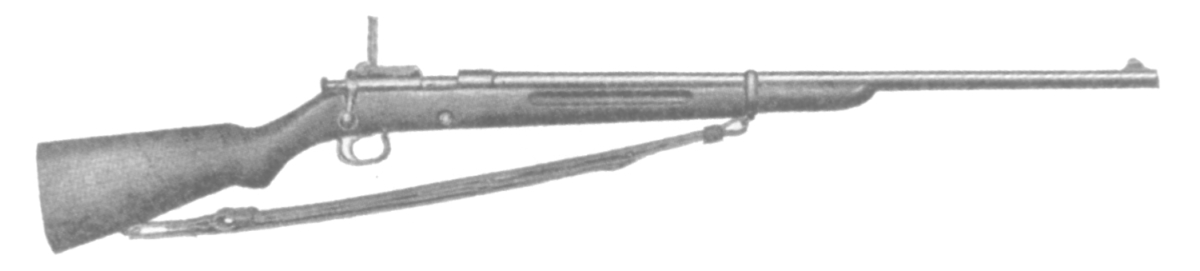
1920 Model 52

In February 1918 the company assigned designers Thomas Crosley Johnson and Frank Burton to begin work on the new match rifle. Johnson had more experience with bolt actions than most at Winchester (which was then primarily a maker of lever- and pump-action firearms), having superintended production of the P-14/M1917 Enfield, as well as having designed a series of prototype military rifles known as Models A through D. (Note: Johnson's further refinement of the Model D in sporting form, the Model E, would issue as the limited-production handmade Model 51 Imperial- which would give rise to his Model 54 and that in turn to the renowned Model 70, the "rifleman's rifle.") Johnson quickly obtained approval for a receiver based closely on that of the Model D, together with a barrel adapted from the .22 target version of the Model 1885. The stock from the receiver back was modeled on that of the Model D, which in turn had been derived from the Model 1895 Winchester-Lee; but incorporated a forearm based on a custom Single Shot target stock designed in 1908 by Winchester's house marksman, Capt. Albert F. Laudensack. (Note: Laudensack himself would be personally responsible for much of the Model 52's later development)

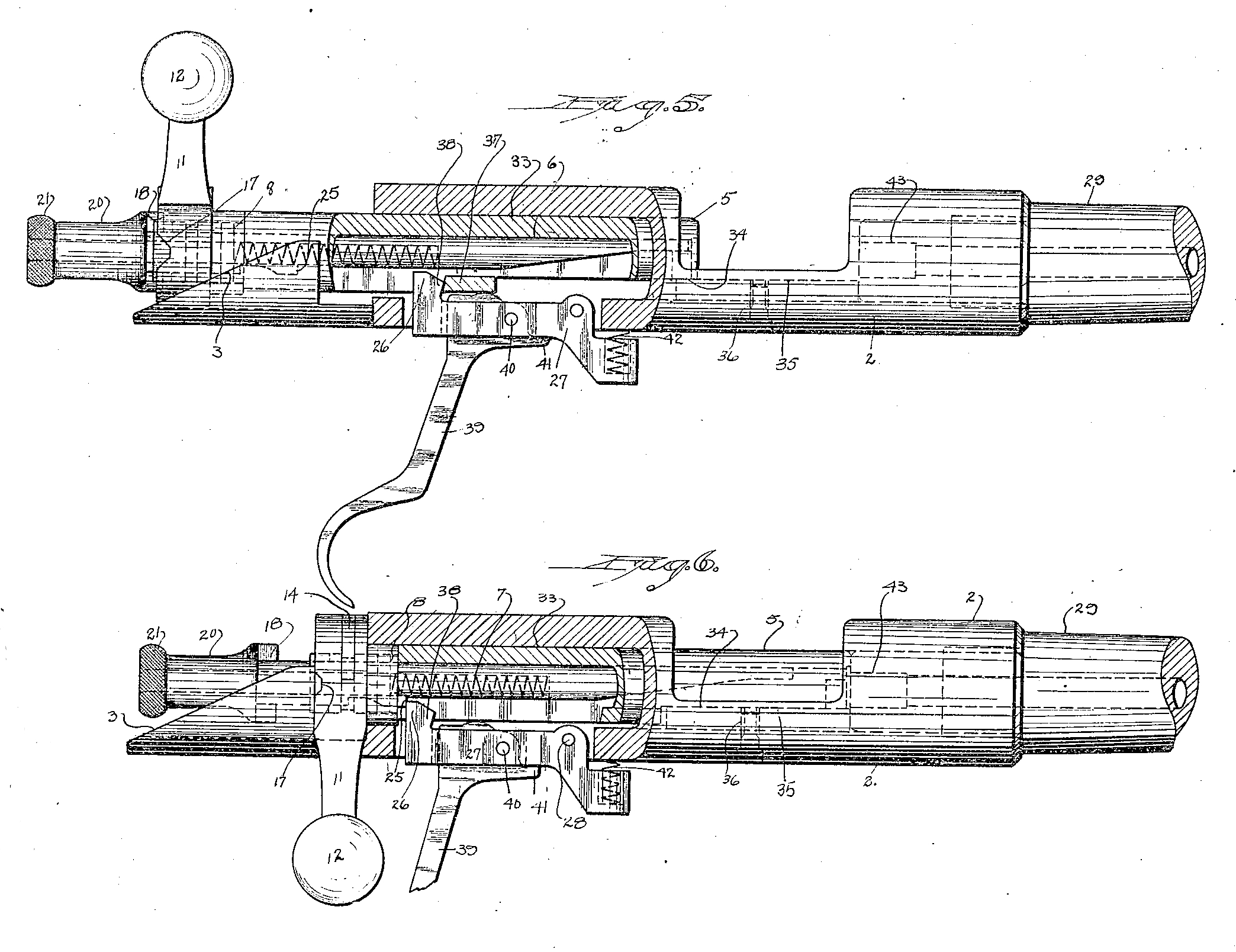
Patent drawing of Johnson and Burton's revised magazine-fed action

With the externals settled, Johnson and Burton turned to developing the action for what was now "Experimental Design No. 111." Each built a prototype of his own design in Winchester's Model Shop, both at this stage still single-shot. In the fall of 1918 the project's requirements were changed to include a detachable 5-round box magazine: neither Johnson's nor Burton's original bolts would work with a magazine feed, but a combination incorporating elements of both proved highly satisfactory. A finalized repeater prototype was made in April 1919 and taken to Washington where it was evaluated by Lt. Col. Townsend Whelen of the General Staff, Director of Civilian Marksmanship Maj. Richard LaGarde, and Gen. Fred Phillips of the National Rifle Association of America, who were enthusiastic–—- although guarded about the prospects of a Government contract.

Whelen further recommended that pre-production samples be rushed out in time for the National Matches at Caldwell, New Jersey that August. Six "G22R" prototypes were readied, and equipped five individual event winners and were used by fourteen members of the victorious Dewar Trophy Team. Having surpassed the new Savage Model 19, the new Winchester was the talk of the tournament and was designated Model 52 on 11th September 1919. (Note: The 52 was Winchester's second firearm and first production firearm to use the new two-digit model numbering system, which replaced the old year-model numbering under a policy announced in August 1919) Full production commenced in April 1920 (using the lines and machinery originally installed to produce the P-14/M1917 Enfield). (Note: Winchester acquired ownership from the Government by swapping the Enfield equipment for that the company had installed for manufacturing the M1918 BAR)

== Design ==
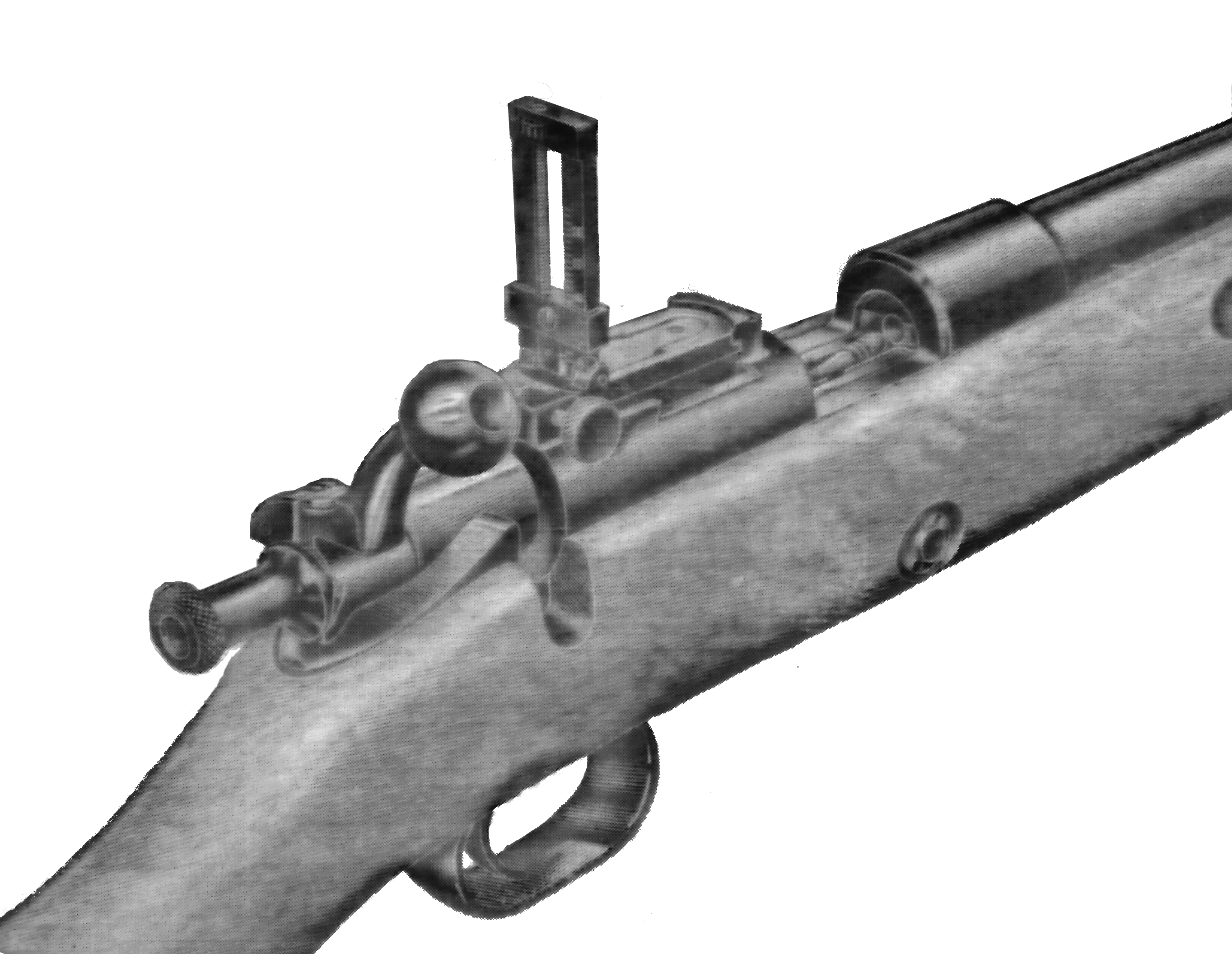
The original Model 52 action, bolt open

The Model 52 was a non-rotating, rear-locked bolt-action design. The Model D-derived receiver was cylindrical, bored and machined from a forged billet, and of substantial thickness. The bolt's dual locking lugs were part of the rotating bolt-handle collar, which provided a camming action to seal the breech on closing and extract the spent case on opening. The bolt itself was undercut for the forward third of its length and rode on polished flats; a projecting lug at the front edge caught the top cartridge in the magazine. The bolt face was rebated so as to surround the case rim, and was chamfered to fit the recessed receiver ring. Dual-opposed sprung claw extractors were inlet into the sides of the bolt, providing controlled cartridge feed. A fixed blade-type ejector was located at the rear of the loading platform.

The original Johnson trigger mechanism, a two-stage or compound-motion military type derived, again, from his Model D, made use of a horizontal sear pivoted from the front; the trigger fit vertically through a pinned mortise in the sear and was shaped at the top so as to cam against the underside of the bolt and depress the assembly, releasing the firing pin; it was a cock-on-closing design. The one-piece striker terminated in a Springfield-like knurled cocking-piece. The wing safety was mounted on the left side of the receiver; when engaged it physically blocked the cocking-piece and cammed it slightly rearward, disengaging the trigger linkage.

== Production history ==
The Model 52 went through many alterations over its sixty years. These changes were not systematic: improvements to the action, stock and so on were made on an ad hoc basis, and it is clearer to treat these alterations so separated rather than as "models."

Note on serial numbers and sub-model or "Style" letter designators: It was Winchester's practice to stamp each receiver with its serial number after milling and preliminary polishing, often weeks or months before the rifle was actually assembled. Accordingly, the alphabetic SN suffixes A, B, C and D were applied specifically to changes to the receiver forging itself, originally as an aid to factory workers: not to new designs of stock, furniture or even trigger mechanism if no change to the receiver was required. Other design changes might coincide in time with a receiver 'submodel,' or first appear in the same catalog: many commentators have been confused by this, talking about such things as the "Model 52B stock" which, strictly speaking, did not exist. From beginning to end the barrels were marked "Winchester Model 52" without a letter. Winchester catalogs and advertising literature did not mention letter designators until the 1950s.

Notwithstanding the foregoing, the Model 52D represented a comprehensive upgrade of the entire rifle.

=== Action ===
- Speed Lock (1930): Frank Burton replaced Johnson's military-style compound-motion trigger, hung from the sear, with a new trigger with a low pivot and rear sear notch, reducing trigger travel by 75% and providing for set-screw pull-weight adjustment. In addition, Burton redesigned the firing pin so as to reduce its travel from approximately .5" (12mm) to .125" (3mm): all of which resulted in a much faster lock time and greater accuracy. At this time the original model's knurled cocking-piece disappeared, replaced by a short trapezoidal boss. This and all subsequent M52 actions cocked on opening, like a Mauser. Burton carefully designed the Speed Lock to fit the existing receiver and bolt body without modification. Winchester for some years offered a conversion kit for older "slowlock" 52s.
- Model 52A (1935, not so marked until 1936): It had been observed that the safety pivot stem was prone to bending, and would then put sideways pressure on the bolt which could cause the relatively thin metal behind the left locking lug to crack. Therefore, the safety stem was shortened by .08 inches, eliminating the bending problem and allowing the left rear receiver wall to be made thicker. Having two slightly different safeties and receiver forgings resulted in some confusion on the assembly line, so beginning in June 1936 the modified receivers were stamped with xxxxxA serial numbers. There was otherwise no difference from the "pre-A" Speed Locks.
- Single-shot Adapter (1935): Not a design change so much as an accessory, the Adapter was effectively a dummy magazine with a shaped top, to facilitate manual loading.
- Model 52B, "Improved" Speed Lock (1937): Laudensack replaced the original left-mounted wing safety with a more convenient sliding-plate safety on the right side of the receiver. The 52B design also raised the left receiver wall abreast the magazine higher than the right, whereas on earlier versions both sides were flush with the loading platform. Laudensack also modified the Speed Lock mechanism, including the addition of an adjustable trigger-return spring and a sprung sear-disengagement plunger. Unfortunately this revised Speed Lock proved immediately unpopular, most shooters considering it to have excessive vibration and creep compared to the original—-- as well as to the "Miracle Trigger" of the new Remington 37, the 52's first serious American competitor.
- "Round-top" receiver: The original Model 52 had a flat milled in the top of the receiver bridge with a dovetail machined into it for sight mounting. Round top receivers were available on special order as early as 1931, as Model #5205R, which was equipped with the Lyman 48T aperture sight mounted on the right side of the receiver. Introduced in 1934 Sporting Model also came equipped with the round receiver. With the introduction of the "B" model in 1937 round receivers became an option on target models as well. The "flat-top" was discontinued in 1946 (none had actually been made since 1941) and all postwar 52s had the round-top form.
- Model 52C (1951): During the wartime hiatus the Post-War Production Recommendation Committee proposed that when Model 52 manufacture resumed, the poorly received Style B trigger should be replaced with a completely new design. In the event, Winchester returned to the 52B when the war ended, but in the meantime an extensive (and time-consuming) scientific study of lock mechanisms was undertaken. The result was Harry Sefried's two-lever Micro-Motion trigger, introduced in 1951. Adjustable for pull-weight between 2.5 and 6 lbs, (Note: While this seems heavy by modern standards, at this time for safety reasons the NRA and most other match sponsors required a minimum of 3 lbs.) and travel between .030 and an almost imperceptible .003 inches, the Micro-Motion was an instant success, and considered the new state of the art in match rifle trigger locks.
- Model 52D (1961): In 1956 the US Olympic rifle team commissioned ten custom Model 52Cs for the upcoming Melbourne Games. These became the prototypes for the Style D when Winchester elected to redesign the entire rifle literally lock, stock, and barrel. The 52D action differed from its predecessors in being a single-shot: eliminating the magazine aperture in the receiver base rendered the entire assembly stiffer and (theoretically) more accurate. There was also a new Micro-Motion trigger lock based on the Style C but with different geometry, and adjustable to as little as one pound. On the International Match version (1969), a trigger assembly by master gunsmith Karl Kenyon or an ISU set-trigger were offered as alternatives to the Winchester trigger.
- Model 52E (1969): The Model 52E was a D-model with the receiver milled to accept an aluminum bedding block/recoil lug (only installed on the International Match, 3-Position and Prone versions), and which had, for the first time on a 52 target model, telescope mounting holes drilled and tapped in the forward receiver. The loading feed geometry was also slightly tweaked from that of the Style D, and on later production the bolt handle was flattened. Winchester catalogs of the time listed all Model 52s as either 52Ds or as "International" models; arguably the "52E" never existed as a separate Style, but arose from the E-prefixed serial numbers mandated by the Gun Control Act of 1968. (Note: At this time, for example, all Model 94 serial numbers were prefixed with "F", Model 70s with "G" and so on.)

=== Stock ===
- Laudensack modification (1924–30): Pull lengthened by .5" and the comb raised by the same amount, with a thumb-flute (later omitted); Winchester originally used the same buttstock dimensions as the M1903 Springfield and early evaluators of the rifle had suggested that the pull length was too short. The semi-pistol grip was thickened at the wrist and given a fuller profile, deeper curve and square end. The butt pitch was changed from perpendicular to the comb to near- perpendicular to the barrel axis.
- "Semi-beavertail" stock (1930–48): Forearm widened to a flat-bottomed, trapezoidal profile; finger grooves omitted; drop reduced again. Oil finish replaced varnish. With slight modifications was renamed the Standard Target Stock in 1934.
- Special Target Stock (Optional 1934-36): Similar to Standard Target Stock, but with a taller, wider buttstock.
- Sporting Model (1934–58) See below.
- Adjustable front sling swivel (1935), which necessitated lengthening the forearm by 1.25".
- Marksman Stock (Optional from 1936, standard 1948-61): This heavy Laudensack-designed match stock with high comb and full beavertail forearm outsold the Standard Target Stock, which it eventually replaced. Instead of the standard stock's external barrel band, the Marksman used a light band fixed inside the squared-off fore-end; this would be replaced by a pillar mount after the war (Marksman 1A). There were two slightly different versions: the Marksman 1 for telescopic or high scope-level sights, and the Marksman 2 (1938) for standard-height sights. Soft-bedded by 1948. Discontinued 1961.
- Monte Carlo stock (1953–59) : A modified stock for the Sporting Model with revised buttstock and greatly enlarged, rollover cheekpiece.
- Model D Marksman stock (1961–80): This very heavy stock with full pistol grip, large zero-drop buttstock, and the forearm flare extended back to the bolt handle introduced the free-floating barrel to the Model 52 line; it also featured a rail under the forearm for mounting offhand grips and other accessories. (This stock owed little to the 1956 Olympic rifles, which had custom Dick Morgan freestyle stocks).
- International Match stock (optional from 1969): An Al Freeland freestyle thumbhole stock with adjustable Schützen buttplate; fewer than 750 made. Renamed International 3-Position in 1975.
- International Prone stock (optional from 1975): A variant of the International Match intended for prone shooting. Only 37 made.

=== Barrel ===
- Standard Target: 28", 1" at the receiver tapering to .75"
- Heavy Target (optional 1927-1961): 28", 1" at the receiver tapering to .875"
- Bull Barrel (optional 1939-1960): 28", 1.125" at the receiver tapering to .875". Model 52 Bull-guns came exclusively with the Marksman stock.
- Sporting (1934–1959): 24", .830" at the receiver tapering to .555"
- Model D Heavy Target (optional from 1961): 28", 1.0625" at the receiver tapering to .875"
- International Match (from 1969, with International Match/3P/Prone stocks): Heavy Target pattern, precision-rifled and lead-lapped, with a rebated muzzle (omitted in late examples). The chamber was hand-cut to such tolerances that a cartridge could not be fully seated by finger pressure.
- Stainless steel and nickel steel barrels were offered briefly in 1930-33

=== Sights ===
==== Iron ====
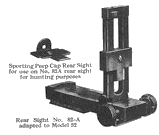
82A aperture sight

All Model 52s with iron sights were equipped with receiver-mounted aperture sights, never barrel mounts, tang mounts or open sights.

Because at the time the Model 52 was developed many Army- and NRA-sponsored matches were restricted to "military-style" sights, and because Winchester had hopes of selling the 52 to the War Department as a marksmanship training rifle, Burton and Laudensack designed a folding ladder sight for the new target rifle. Designated 82A, it bore some resemblance to the sight on the M1903 Springfield, especially in its pivoting-base windage adjustment (albeit controlled by dual-opposed thumbscrews rather than the Springfield rack-and-worm). However, elevation adjustment was governed by a micrometer click-wheel for precision, not free-sliding like genuine military sights. The Burton-Laudensack helped Model 52 shooters sweep matches and set records throughout the 1920s, but more precise aftermarket sights took over the field and the increasingly obsolescent 82A was not offered after World War II.

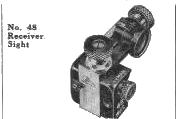
Lyman 48 aperture sight

Winchester catalogs from the beginning listed 52s with sights by other makers; indeed, the buyer could specify any compatible peep on a special-order basis. The most common of these was the Lyman 48 series: the 48-J and -JH for flat-top dovetail-mount receivers, and the 48-F and -FH for round-top side-mount rifles (standard on the 52 Sporting Model). Other popular sights were the Lyman 525, the Wittek-Vaver 35-MIELT, the Marble Goss 52, and the Redfield 90 and 100. Late 52s frequently were fitted with Redfield "Olympic" or "International" match sights.

The stock Winchester 93B front sight was an undercut blade type; aftermarket rear sights were typically paired with a compatible globe sight such as the Lyman 17A (except for the Sporter, on which a hooded Lyman or Redfield Gold Bead front sight was standard).

==== Telescopic ====
Barrel-mounted scope blocks were optional on early-production 52s; they were made standard in 1924. These blocks were mounted 6.2" apart, giving 1.2" per minute-of-angle graduation at 100 yards. Originally the Winchester A3 and A5 as well as Lyman scopes were offered. In 1933 new bases with Fecker notches were introduced, using standard 7.2" (1"/MOA) spacing; these were compatible with any normal telescopic sight. Long-barrel Fecker, Unertl and Lyman Targetspot were popular telescopes for prewar Model 52 target rifles, with Redfield and Bausch & Lomb becoming ascendant in the 1950s. The late-70s 52E had additional mounting holes drilled in the forward receiver ring.

Sporting Models were not factory fitted for telescopic sights (except by special order) until 1953, when 52C Sporter receivers (not barrels) were provided with tapped and plugged screw holes. However, many earlier examples were so equipped by private gunsmiths: nearly all the popular hunting scopes have been mounted at one time or another. A period-correct scope is not considered by collectors to detract significantly from the 'originality' of a vintage Sporter.

== The Sporting Model ==
Around 1931 Major John W. Hessian, a friend of new Winchester president John M. Olin, (Note: More correctly, Olin was First Vice-President of Western Cartridge Co. (later Olin Industries), which acquired Winchester out of receivership in 1931; in practice he ran Winchester) had a private gunsmith remount his Model 52 in a custom lightweight "sporting" stock. Olin was so impressed that he ordered the development of a 52 Sporter as a production model, which made its debut in 1934.

The Sporting Model had a lightweight 24-inch barrel and an elegant gloss-finished stock of figured walnut with a slender, tapering capped forearm, pronounced pistol grip, high comb and cheekpiece, and fancy checkering. The action was identical with contemporary (Note: In actual practice Sporter submodel or "Style" changeovers lagged behind the Target Model by up to two years, as Winchester found it a salable way to use up existing stocks of older actions.) target models, except that the receiver top was left round rather than milled flat. Weighing only 7-1/4 pounds, it came with Lyman 48-F aperture sights standard, and retailed for the substantial sum of $88.50 (the equivalent of nearly $1520 in 2012).

The Sporter was in all respects a deluxe rifle. While Winchester already had a reputation as the Cadillac of American arms manufacturers, the 52 Sporter was produced with a degree of fit and finish appropriate to a custom gunsmith's shop. Esquire magazine called it "the piece de resistance of all sporting rifles. It's a diamond in a field of chipped glass-- the rifle for the connoisseur." Field & Stream named the 52 Sporter one of the "50 Best Guns Ever Made," calling it "unrivalled in beauty and accuracy."

Understandably the Sporter represented only a small percentage of Model 52s produced between 1934 and its discontinuation in 1959: it is today the most collectible of all 52 variants and a good Sporter will generally bring double or more the price of a comparable Target. (This market reality has unfortunately attracted forgers, and fake "Sporters" converted from target models have fooled the unwary).

== Reproductions ==
In the 1990s the Herstal Group,licensed to use the Winchester trademark by the Olin Corporation, marketed "reissue" Model 52 Sporting rifles in two different barrel weights. These reproductions were made by Miroku in Japan, and sold under both the Winchester and Browning brands.

== See also ==
- Winchester Repeating Arms Company
- Winchester Rifle
- List of Winchester models

== Sources ==
1. Goode, Monroe H., "Modern Sporting Rifles," in Esquire's First Sports Reader. New York: Barnes 1945
2. Henshaw, Thomas, The History of Winchester Firearms 1866-1992, 6th Ed. Academic Learning Co. 1993
3. Houze, Herbert, The Winchester Model 52: Perfection in Design. Gun Digest Books 1997
4. Madis, George, The Winchester Book. Houston: Art and Reference House 1971
5. Shideler, Dan, 2008 Standard Catalog of Firearms. Krause Publications 2008.
6. Stroebel, Nick, Old Gunsights: A Collector's Guide 1850-1965. KP Books, 1998
