= Wingo =

Wingo may refer to:

== Airlines ==
- Wingo (airline), a low-cost airline based in Colombia
- Wingo xprs, a small airline company in Finland

== Places in the United States ==
- Wingo, California, a ghost town in Sonoma County
- Wingo, Kentucky, a city in Graves County
- Wingo Branch, a stream in Mississippi

== People ==
- Wingo (surname)
- Wingo Anderson (1886–1950), American baseball pitcher

== Other uses ==
- Wingo (shooting), a 1970s shotgun shooting sport
- Barker v. Wingo, a 1972 United States Supreme Court case
