= T. C. Johnson =

American firearms designer

T.C. Johnson
- Born: Thomas Crossley Johnson; May 12, 1862
- Died: June 4, 1934 (aged 72)
- Occupations: Industrial Designer, Industrial Engineer, Firearms Designer, Gunsmith
- Years active: 1885–1934

Thomas Crossley Johnson (1862–1934) was an American firearms designer. The son of a President of the Yale Safe and Iron Company, Johnson was trained as an industrial engineer and worked for several companies prior to employment with the Winchester Repeating Arms Company in 1885. While working for Winchester, Johnson was responsible for some of Winchester's most memorable gun designs:

- Model 1903, first commercially available rimfire self-loading rifle
- Model 1905, first commercially available centerfire self-loading rifle
- Model 1911, self-loading shotgun
- Model 12, slide action shotgun
- Model 21, double-barreled shotgun
- Model 51, "Imperial" bolt-action sporting rifle
- Model 52 bolt-action smallbore match rifle
- Model 54 bolt-action hunting rifle (which evolved into the renowned Model 70).

From beginning employment with Winchester in November 1885 to his death in 1934, Johnson was named on 124 patents assigned to the company.

== Sources ==
1. Madis, George, The Winchester Book. Houston: Art and Reference House 1971
2. Williamson, Harold, Winchester, The Gun That Won the West. Washington: Combat Forces Press 1952
