= Winchester Repeating Arms Company Historic District =

Historic district in Connecticut, United States

- U.S. National Register of Historic Places
- U.S. Historic district
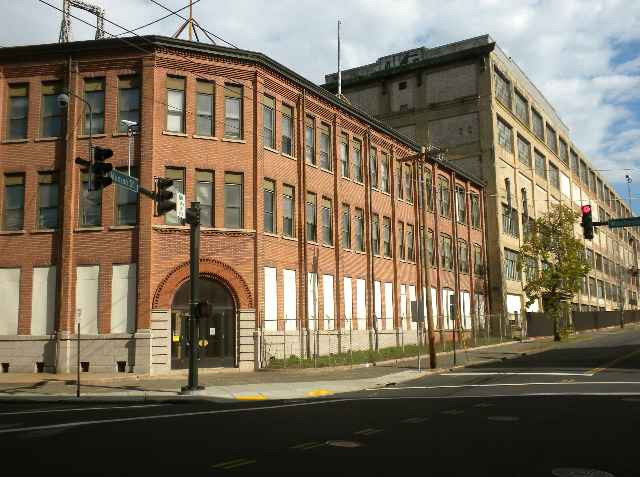
- Front of Winchester Repeating Arms Company (1870s), 275 Winchester Avenue, New Haven, Connecticut.

- Location within Connecticut Location within the United States
- Location: Roughly bounded by Hamden Town line, Mansfield, Hazel & Division Streets, Winchester Avene, and Sherman Parkway, New Haven, Connecticut
- Coordinates: 41°19′16″N 72°55′55″W
- Area: 255 acres (103 ha) (excludes increase of 2015)
- Built: 1912
- Architect: Robinson, Leoni W.; Et al.
- Architectural style: Colonial Revival, Italianate, Queen Anne
- NRHP reference No.: 87002552 (original); 13000898 (increase)

Significant dates
- Added to NRHP: January 28, 1988
- Boundary increase: April 21, 2015

The Winchester Repeating Arms Company Historic District is a historic district in New Haven, Connecticut that was listed on the National Register of Historic Places in 1988. It includes 867 properties, which "include 858 major structures and 131 notable outbuildings." Of these structures, 876 are buildings deemed to contribute to the historical and/or architectural significance of the area, and most of these are residential. However the center of the district is "dominated" by the 75-acre (30 ha) tract of the former Winchester Repeating Arms Company, which contains industrial buildings.

The district includes and surrounds the old Winchester plant later run by U.S. Repeating Arms; the plant was important to both of its adjoining residential neighborhoods. Some of the plant has been operated by Science Park at Yale, a business incubator with Yale University associations.

== Significance ==
According to the district's 1987 nomination document:

The district is historically significant for two reasons. First its core encompasses the extensive surviving portions of the industrial complex developed by the former Winchester Repeating Arms Company, one of the nation's foremost late 19th- and early 20th-century armament manufacturers. Second, the district as a whole forms New Haven's most nearly intact and cohesive surviving example of the inherent relationship between the growth of modern industry and the emergence of large working-class residential neighborhoods, a relationship typically associated with the development of many of the nation's northeastern urban communities during the late 19th and early 20th centuries (Criterion A). The district is architecturally significant for three reasons. First, its core embraces numerous examples of period industrial structures. Second, the majority of these structures were built for the Winchester Repeating Arms Company according to designs provided by Leoni W. Robinson, one of New Haven's premier late 19/early 20th-century architects. Finally, the district's predominantly residential perimeter areas encompass a host of relatively intact single- and multi-family workers' houses as well as several significant examples of commercial, religious, and municipal buildings dating from this same era. As a group, these perimeter-area buildings represent a variety of important and popular vernacular architectural styles of the era, including late Greek Revival, Italianate, Gothic Revival, Queen Anne and Colonial Revival (Criterion C).

== Residential development ==
Residential development in the district included development of tenement buildings for one, two or three families. Examples are as depicted in accompanying photo 2 (134-36, 138-40, 142-44, 146-48 Mansfield Street), photo 4 (166-68, 162-64, 156-58, 152-54, 146-48 Sheffield Street, photo 5 (220-30 Division Street), photo 13 (567 Dixwell Avenue), photo 16 (552-54, 558 Winchester Avenue) and photo 20 (368, 370, 374, 378 Dixwell Avenue). Two speculators who were very successful with such residential development were Joseph Sheldon and John W. Bishop: "these men were the moving force behind the 19th-century development of virtually all of the properties which currently line both sides of Admiral and most of Henry Streets, as well as the construction of most of the houses along the southwestern side of Munson Street directly opposite the Winchester complex. Their work is depicted in accompanying photo 22 (51, 49, 43, 41, 39 Henry Street), photo 12 (49, 53, 55, 59 Admiral Street) and accompanying photo 9 (206, 208, 210, 212, 214, 216, 218, and 220-22 Munson Street).

== Industrial development ==
The Winchester firm had started operations on Union Street in the Wooster Square neighborhood of New Haven, and moved to Bridgeport in 1866. It relocated from Bridgeport to New Haven in 1870, to the current location in the district. The original buildings which it built no longer exist. The firm grew to more than 600 employees by 1887 and "well in excess of 1,000" by the early 1900s.

== Streets ==
Streets in the district include:

- Mansfield Street

Accompanying photo 1 depicts houses at 72, 76, 82 Mansfield Street
Accompanying photo 2 depicts 134-36, 138-40, 142-44, 146-48 Mansfield Street
Accompanying photo 3 depicts 182, 184 Mansfield Street

- Sheffield Street

Accompanying photo 4 depicts 166-68, 162-64, 156-58, 152-54, 146-48 Sheffield Street
Accompanying photo 6 depicts the Shelton Avenue School, at 155 Sheffield Street

- Division Street

Accompanying photo 5 depicts 220-30 Division Street

- Winchester Avenue

Accompanying photos 7, 8, 24, 25, 26, 27 and 28 depict the Winchester Repeating Arms Company complex, at 275 Winchester Avenue, with some other properties also in view in some of the photos
Accompanying photo 16 depicts 552-54, 558 Winchester Avenue
Accompanying photo 23 depicts the McKesson and Robbins factory building, at 182 Winchester Avenue

- Munson Street

Accompanying photo 9 depicts 206, 208, 210, 212, 214, 216, 218, 220-22 Munson Street

- Thompson Street

Accompanying photo 10 depicts Newhall's Boarding House, built in 1860, at 55-57 Thompson Street

- Ivy Street

Accompanying photo 11 depicts the Ivy Street School, at 1-41 Ivy Street

- Admiral Street

Accompanying photo 12 depicts 49, 53, 55, 59 Admiral Street

- Dixwell Avenue

Accompanying photo 13 depicts 567 Dixwell Avenue
Accompanying photo 14 depicts 495 Dixwell Avenue
Accompanying photo 17 depicts 459 Dixwell Avenue, with decorative bargeboard
Accompanying photo 20 depicts 368, 370, 374, 378 Dixwell Avenue
Accompanying photo 21 depicts 287-89, 297-301 Dixwell Avenue

- Shelton Avenue

Accompanying photo 15 depicts 140 Shelton Avenue
Accompanying photo 19 depicts 7-11, 13-15 Shelton Avenue

- Newhall Street

Accompanying photo 18 depicts 141, 145-47 Newhall Street

- Henry Street

Accompanying photo 22 depicts 51, 49, 43, 41, 39 Henry Street

== Relationship to neighborhoods ==
The district is located in the Newhallville and Dixwell neighborhoods defined by the city of New Haven, Connecticut.

The 1987 NRHP nomination document reads: the "255-acre district includes most of the southern and northern portions of the city's Newhallville and Dixwell neighborhoods, respectively."

== Gallery ==
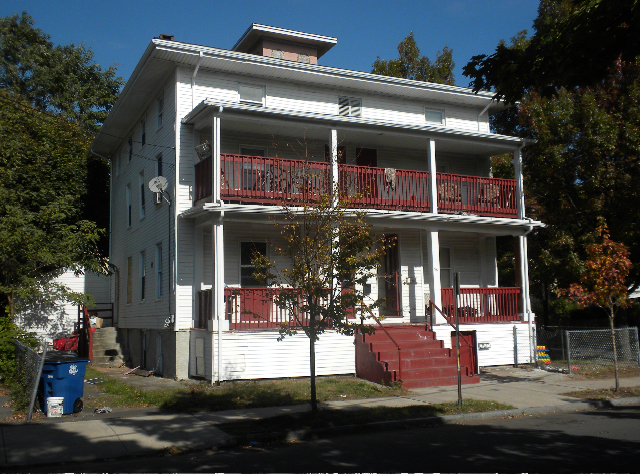
Newhall's Boarding House (1860), 55-57 Thompson Street

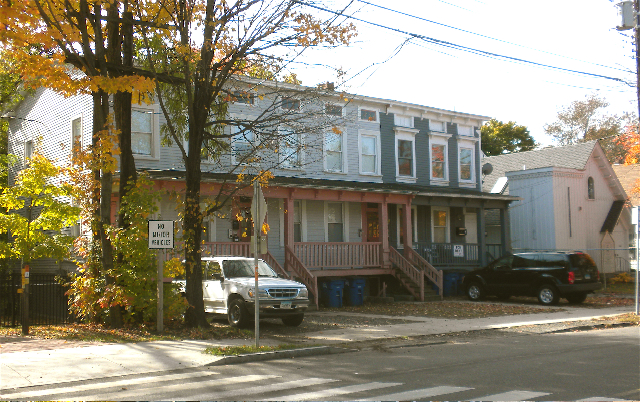
220-22 Division Street (about 1875), frame row houses and small church.

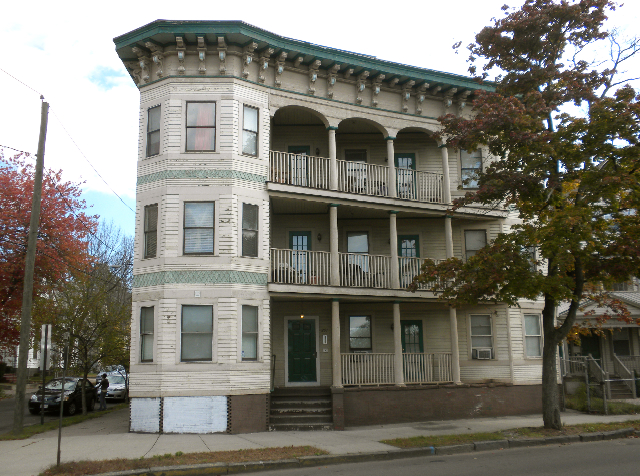
201 Winchester Avenue

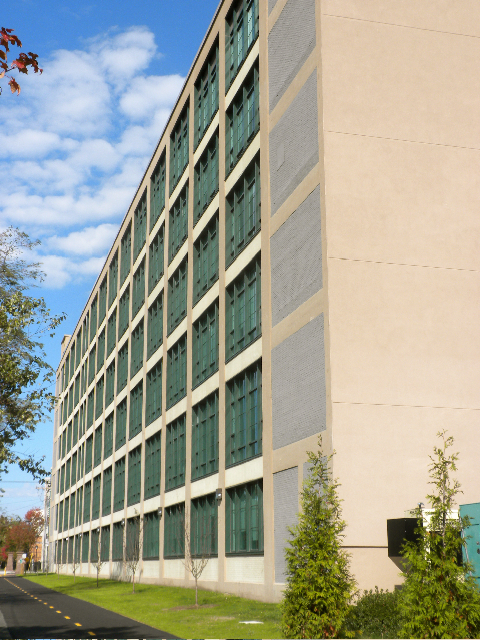
McKesson and Robbins factory building (1930s), 182 Winchester Avenue

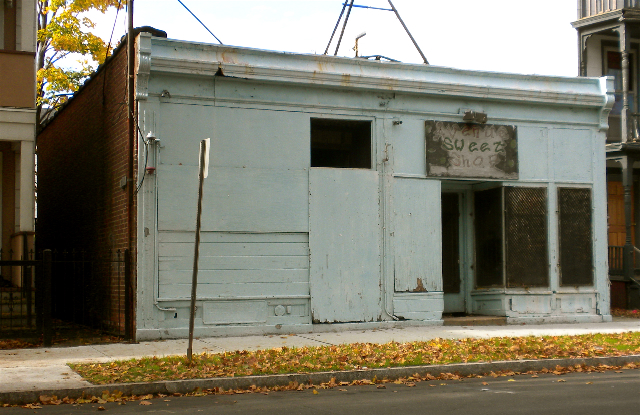
552-4 Winchester Avenue (Demolished.)

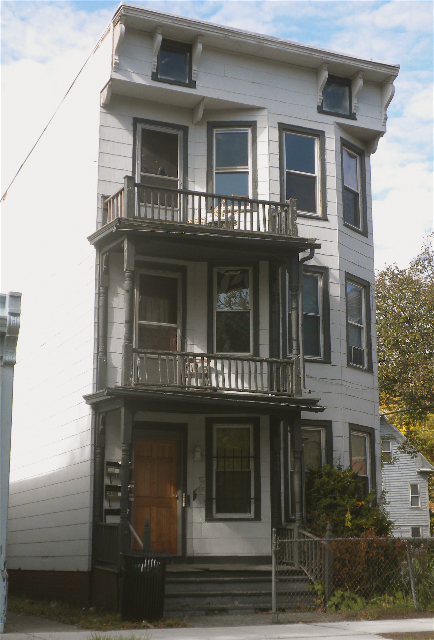
558 Winchester Avenue

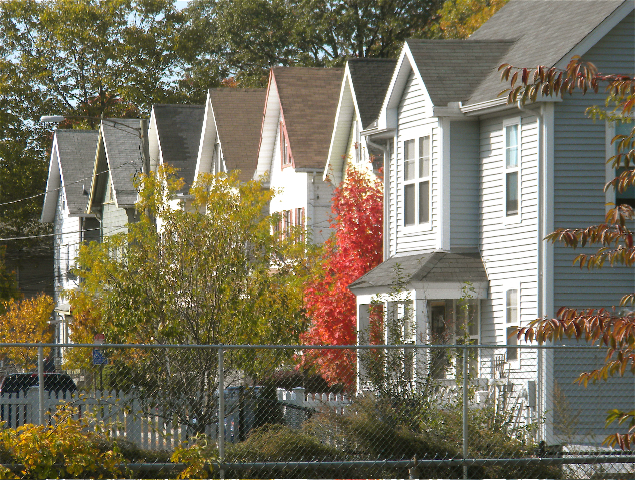
Houses on Admiral Street

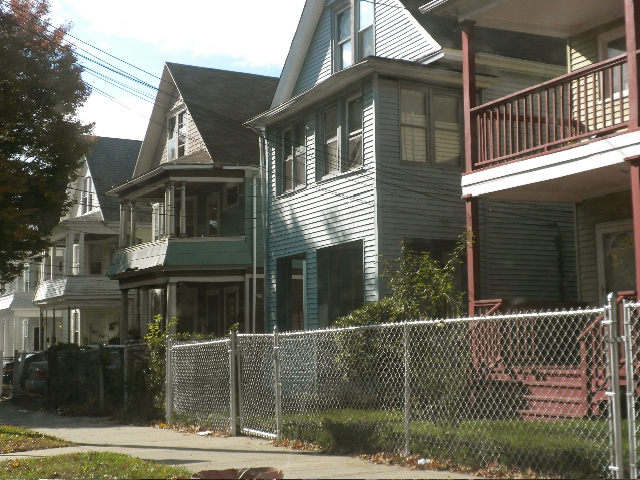
Houses on Sheffield Street

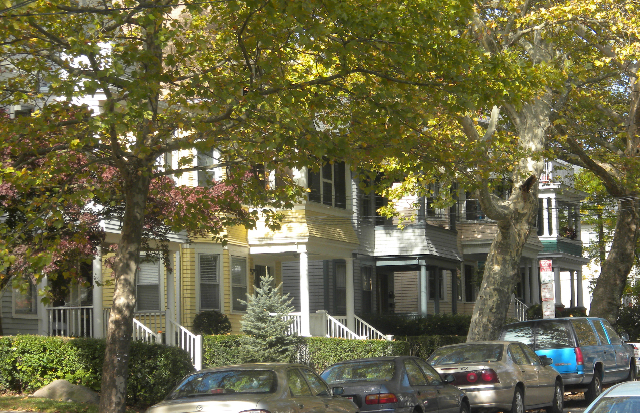
Houses on Mansfield Street

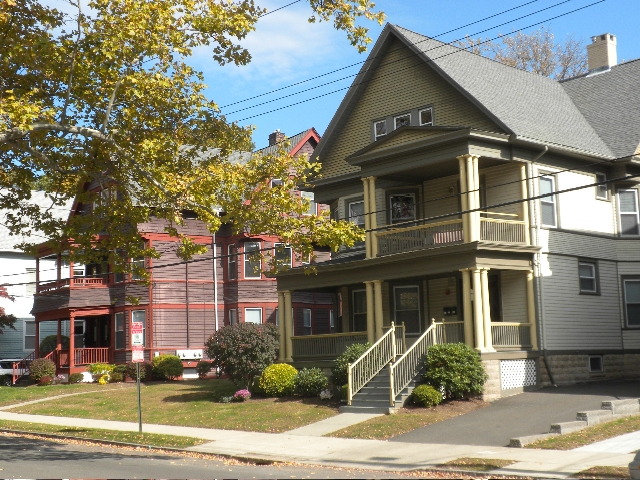
109-111 Mansfield Street

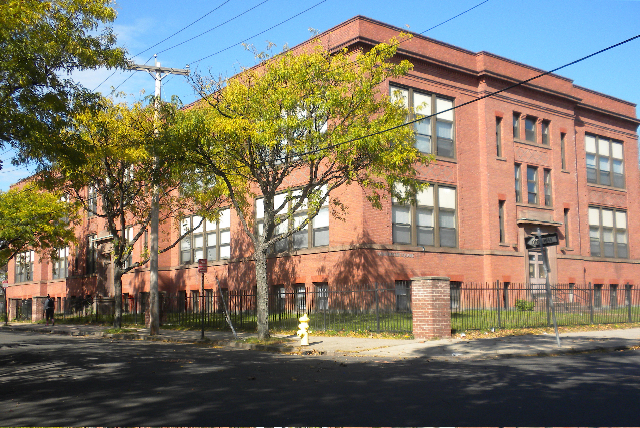
Ivy Street School (1907), 1-41 Ivy Street

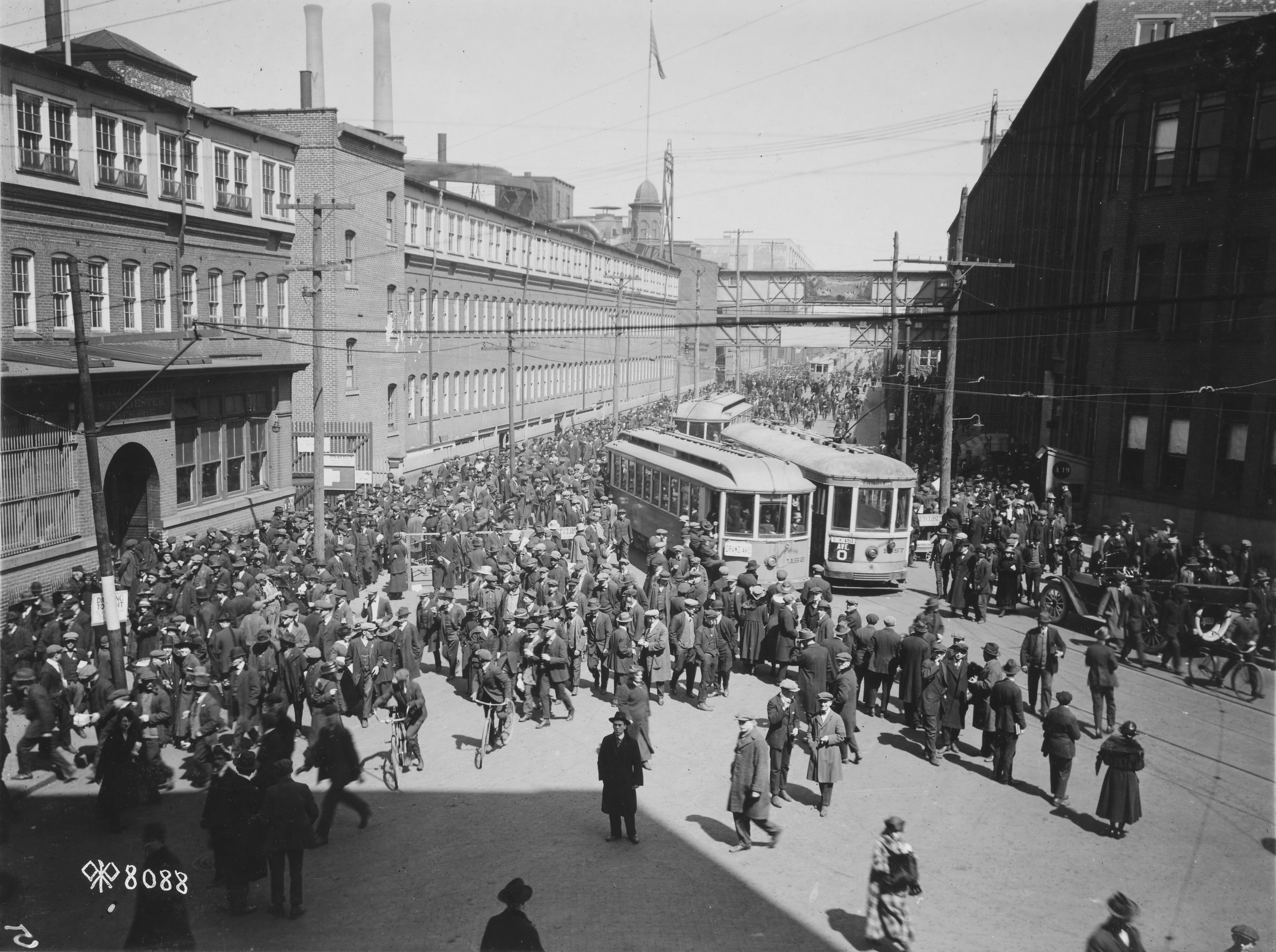
Munson-Winchester intersection, photo from 1918

== See also ==
- Winchester Repeating Arms Company
- U.S. Repeating Arms Company
- Dixwell (neighborhood)
- Newhallville (neighborhood)
- National Register of Historic Places listings in New Haven, Connecticut
