= Winchester Repeating Arms Company =

American maker of repeating firearms

- Company type: Private
- Industry: Arms industry
- Predecessor: New Haven Arms Company
- Founded: 1866; 160 years ago
- Founder: Oliver Winchester
- Defunct: 1931 (receivership)
- Fate: Bought by Western Cartridge Company (which later became part of the Olin Corporation)
- Successor: Winchester-Western Company
- Headquarters: New Haven, Connecticut, U.S.
- Products: Firearms, ammunition and accessories
- Website: winchesterguns.com (arms) winchester.com (ammunition)

The Winchester Repeating Arms Company was a prominent American manufacturer of repeating firearms and ammunition. The firm was established in 1866 by Oliver Winchester and was located in New Haven, Connecticut. The firm went into receivership in 1931 and was bought by the Western Cartridge Company, a forerunner of the Olin Corporation. The Winchester brand name is still owned by the Olin Corporation, which makes ammunition under that name. The Winchester name is also used under license for firearms produced by two subsidiaries of the FN Browning Group – FN Herstal of Belgium and the Browning Arms Company of Ogden, Utah.

== History ==
=== Early history ===
==== Predecessors ====
The ancestor of the Winchester Repeating Arms Company was the Horace Smith and Daniel Wesson partnership of Norwich, Connecticut (not to be confused with the famous Smith & Wesson Revolver Company founded later by the same men). Smith and Wesson acquired Lewis Jennings' improved version of inventor Walter Hunt's 1848 "Volition Repeating Rifle" and its caseless "Rocket Ball" ammunition, which had been produced in small numbers by Robbins & Lawrence of Windsor, Vermont. Jennings' rifle was a commercial failure, and Robbins & Lawrence ceased production in 1852. Smith designed a much-improved rifle based on Jennings' design, and the partners also hired away Robbins & Lawrence shop foreman Benjamin Tyler Henry.

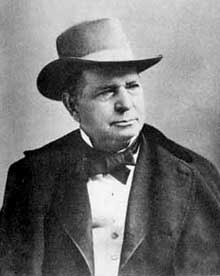
Oliver Winchester

In 1855, the Smith and Wesson partnership, in order to manufacture the "Volcanic" lever-action rifle and pistol, sought investors and incorporated as the Volcanic Repeating Arms Company. Its largest stockholder was clothing manufacturer Oliver Winchester. The Volcanic rifle had only limited success. The company moved to New Haven (without Smith or Wesson) in 1856, but by the end of that year, it became insolvent. Oliver Winchester and his partner John M. Davies purchased the bankrupt firm's assets from the remaining stockholders and reorganized it as the New Haven Arms Company in April 1857.

After Smith's departure, Benjamin Henry continued to work with a Smith development project, the self-contained metallic rimfire cartridge, and perfected the much larger, more powerful .44 Henry round. Henry also supervised a new rifle design based loosely on the Volcanic to use the new ammunition, retaining only the general form of the breech mechanism and the tubular magazine. This became the Henry rifle of 1860, which was manufactured by the New Haven Arms Company and used in considerable numbers by certain Union army units during the American Civil War. The Henry rifle ensured New Haven Arms' success, and together with the Spencer rifle, established the lever-action repeater in the firearms market.

==== The Winchester rifle ====
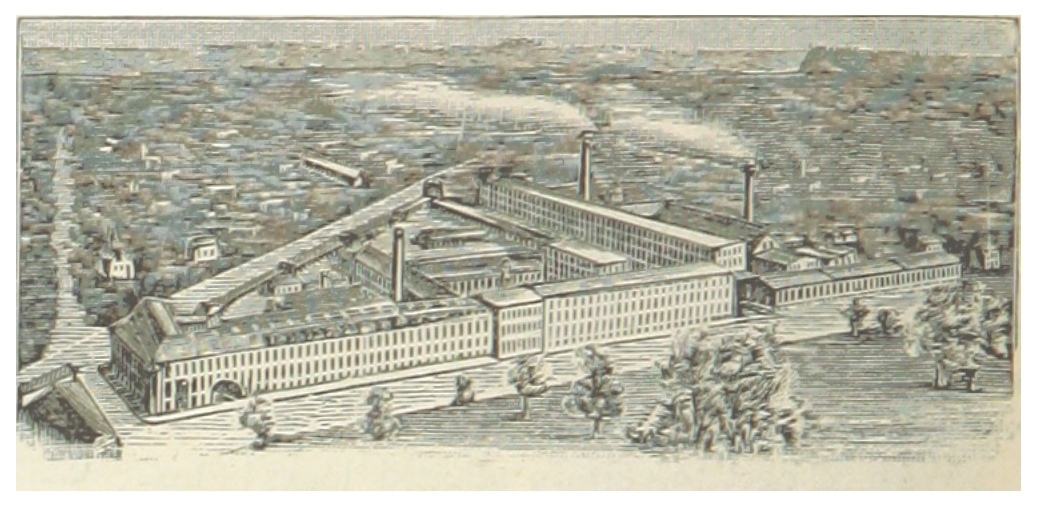
The Winchester arms factory in New Haven, Connecticut, 1891

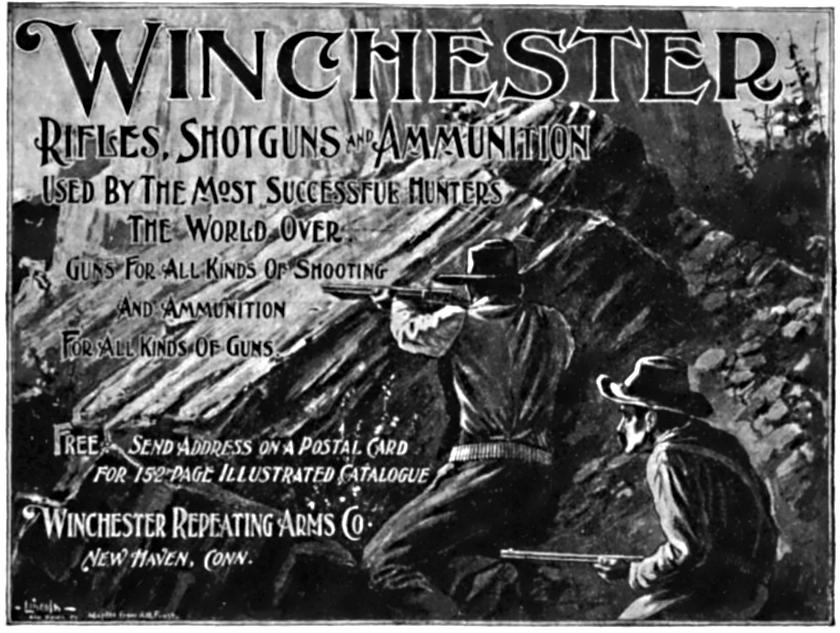
Magazine advertisement from 1898

In 1866, Benjamin Henry, angered over what he believed was inadequate compensation, attempted to have the Connecticut legislature award ownership of New Haven Arms to him. Oliver Winchester, hastening back from Europe, forestalled the move and reorganized New Haven Arms yet again as the Winchester Repeating Arms Company. Winchester had the basic design of the Henry rifle completely modified and improved to become the first Winchester rifle, the Model 1866, which fired the same .44 caliber rimfire cartridges as the Henry but had an improved magazine (with the addition of a loading gate on the right side of the receiver, invented by Winchester employee Nelson King) and, for the first time, a wooden forend. The Henry and the 1866 Winchester shared a unique double firing pin that struck the head of the rimfire cartridge in two places when the weapon was fired, increasing the chances that the fulminate in the hollow rim would ignite the 28 or so grains of black powder inside the case.

Another extremely popular model was rolled out in 1873. The Model 1873 introduced the first Winchester center fire cartridge, the .44-40 WCF (Winchester Center Fire). These rifle families are commonly known as the "Gun That Won the West."

The Model 1873 was followed by the Model 1876 (or "Centennial Model"), a larger version of the '73, which used the same toggle-link action and brass cartridge elevator used in the Henry. It was chambered for longer, more powerful cartridges such as .45-60 WCF, .45-75 WCF, and .50-95 WCF. The action was not long enough to allow Winchester to achieve their goal of producing a repeating rifle capable of handling the .45-70 Government cartridge; this would not happen until they began manufacture of the Browning-designed Model 1886.

Oliver Winchester died in December 1880; his son and successor, William Wirt Winchester, died of tuberculosis four months later. William Wirt Winchester's widow, Sarah Winchester, used her inheritance and income from the company to build what is now known as the Winchester Mystery House.

From 1883, John Browning worked in partnership with the Winchester Repeating Arms Company and designed a series of rifles and shotguns, most notably the Winchester Model 1885 Single Shot, Winchester Model 1887 lever-action shotgun, Model 1897 pump-action shotgun; and the lever-action Model 1886, Model 1892, Model 1894 and Model 1895 rifles. Several of these are still in production today through companies such as Browning, Rossi, Navy Arms, and others which have revived several of the discontinued models or produced reproductions.

=== 20th-century developments ===
==== The turn of the twentieth century ====
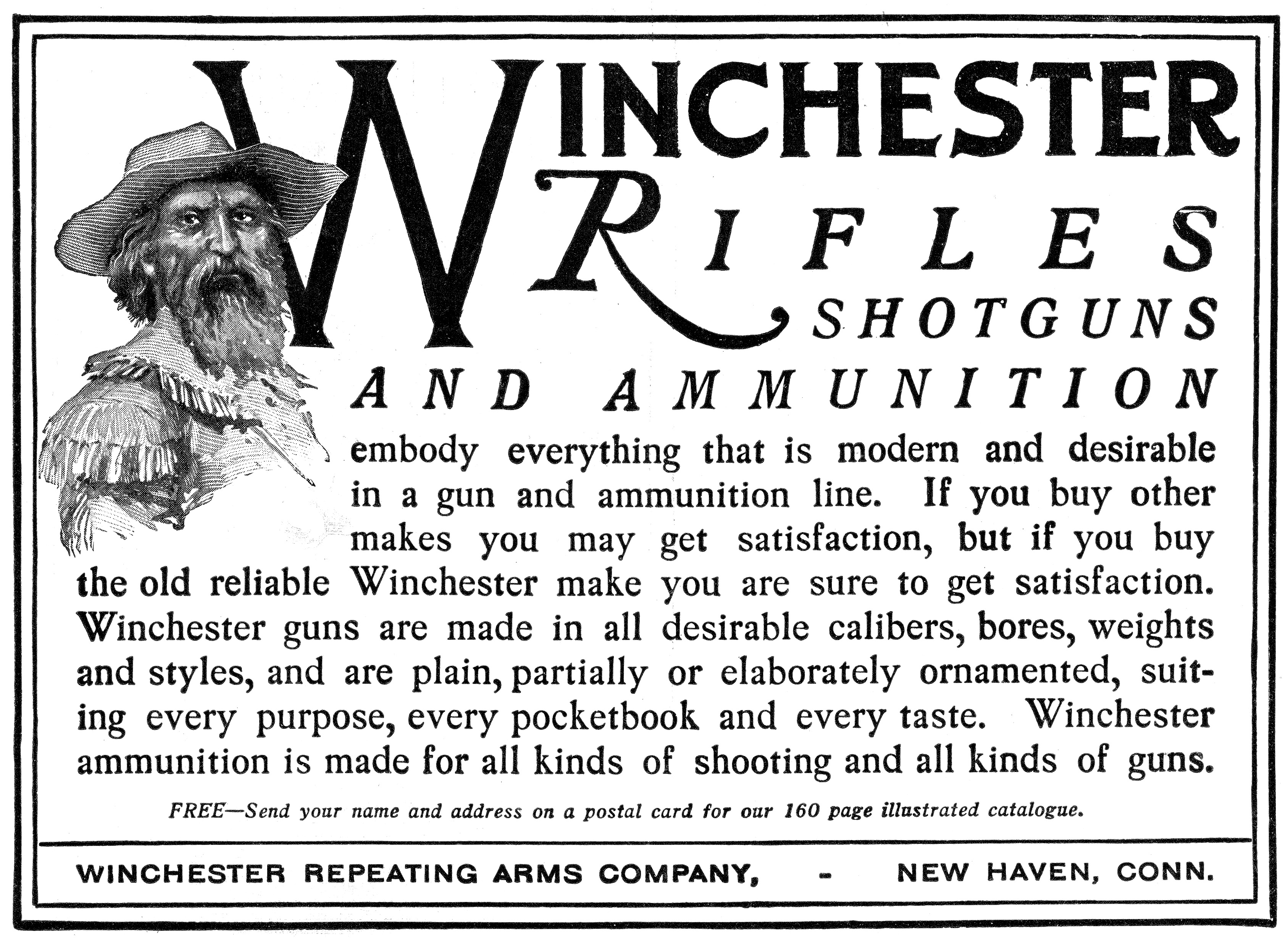
Winchester Rifles ad, 1900

The early years of the twentieth century found the Winchester Repeating Arms Company competing with new John Browning designs, manufactured under license by other firearm companies. The race to produce the first commercial self-loading rifle brought forth the .22 rimfire Winchester Model 1903 and later centerfire Model 1905, Model 1907, and Model 1910 rifles. Winchester engineers, after ten years of work, designed the Model 1911 to circumvent Browning's self-loading shotgun patents, prepared by the company's very own patent lawyers. One of Winchester's premier engineers, T.C. Johnson, was instrumental in the development of these self-loading firearms and went on to superintend the designs of Winchester's classic Model 1912, Model 52 and Model 54.

==== The First World War ====
The company was a major producer of the .303 Pattern 1914 Enfield rifle for the British Government and the similar .30-06 M1917 Enfield rifle for the United States during World War I. Working at the Winchester plant during the war, Browning developed the final design of the Browning Automatic Rifle (BAR), of which it produced some 27,000. Browning and the Winchester engineers also developed the Browning .50 caliber machine gun during the war. The caliber .50 BMG (12.7 x 99 mm) ammunition for it was designed by the Winchester ballistic engineers. The commercial rights to these new Browning guns were owned by Colt.

==== Failure and recovery ====
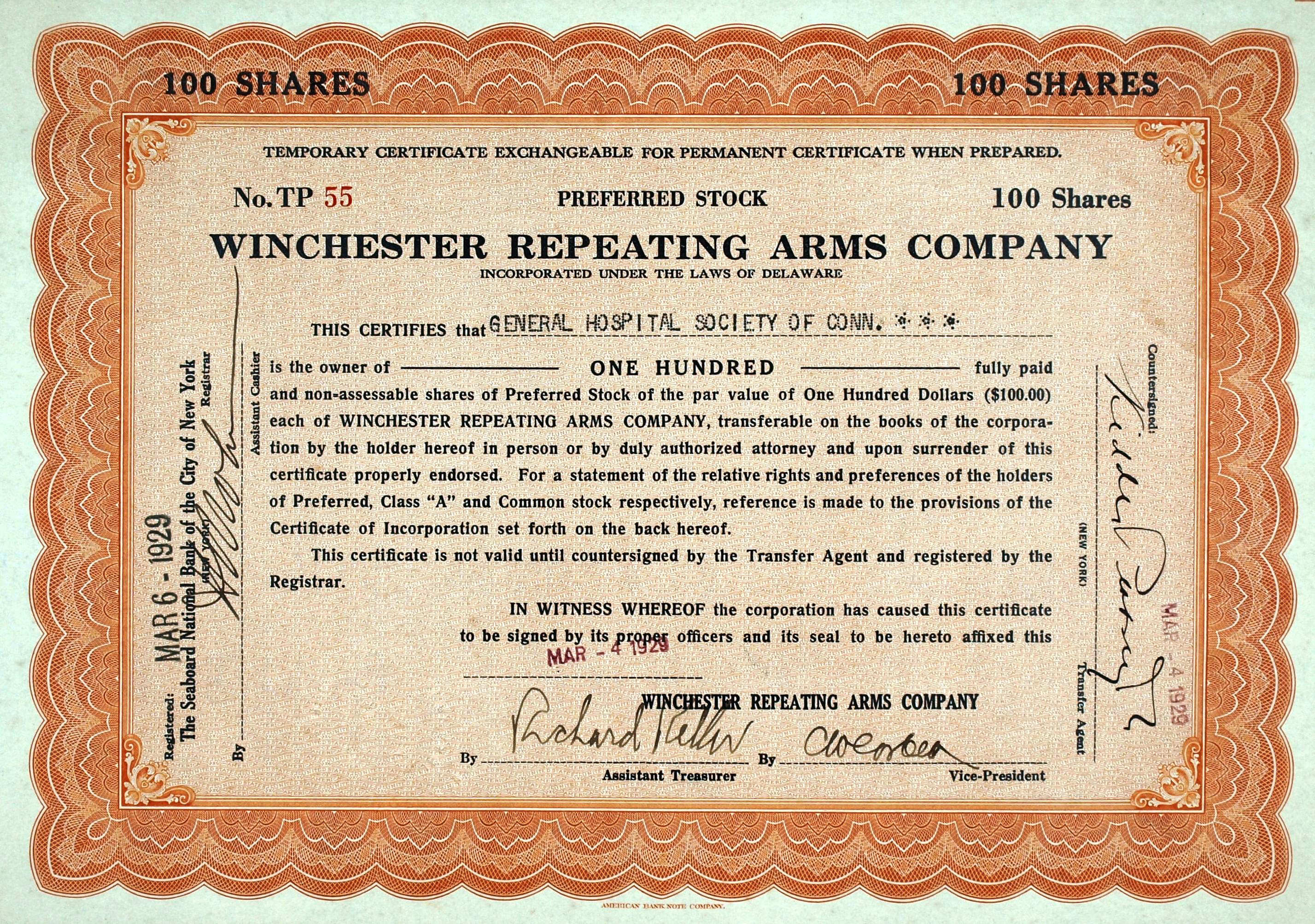
Share of the Winchester Repeating Arms Company, issued 4. March 1929

During the war, Winchester had borrowed heavily to finance its massive expansion. With the return of peace, the company attempted to use its surplus production capacity and pay down its debt by trying to become a general manufacturer of consumer goods – everything from kitchen knives to roller skates to refrigerators, to be marketed through 'Winchester Stores'. They also merged with the Simmons Hardware Company. The Winchester and Keen Kutter brands did business together during the 1920s, but in 1929, they agreed to separate and returned to their core businesses.

The consumer goods strategy was a failure for Winchester, and the Great Depression put the final nail in the company's coffin. The Winchester Repeating Arms Company went into receivership in 1931 and was bought at a bankruptcy auction by the Olin family's Western Cartridge Company on December 22 of that year. Oliver Winchester's firm would maintain a nominal existence until 1935 when Western Cartridge merged with its subsidiary to form the Winchester-Western Company. In 1944, the firearms and ammunition operations would be reorganized as the Winchester-Western Division of Olin Industries.

Western's First Vice-President (John M. Olin) was a sportsman and gun enthusiast, and he started at once to restore the Winchester brand to its former luster by concentrating on its classic models and updated versions thereof, with particular attention to quality and prestige. Olin personally pushed the deluxe Model 52 Sporter and the semi-custom Model 21 double-barreled shotgun. Winchester flourished, even during the later Depression.

==== The Second World War ====
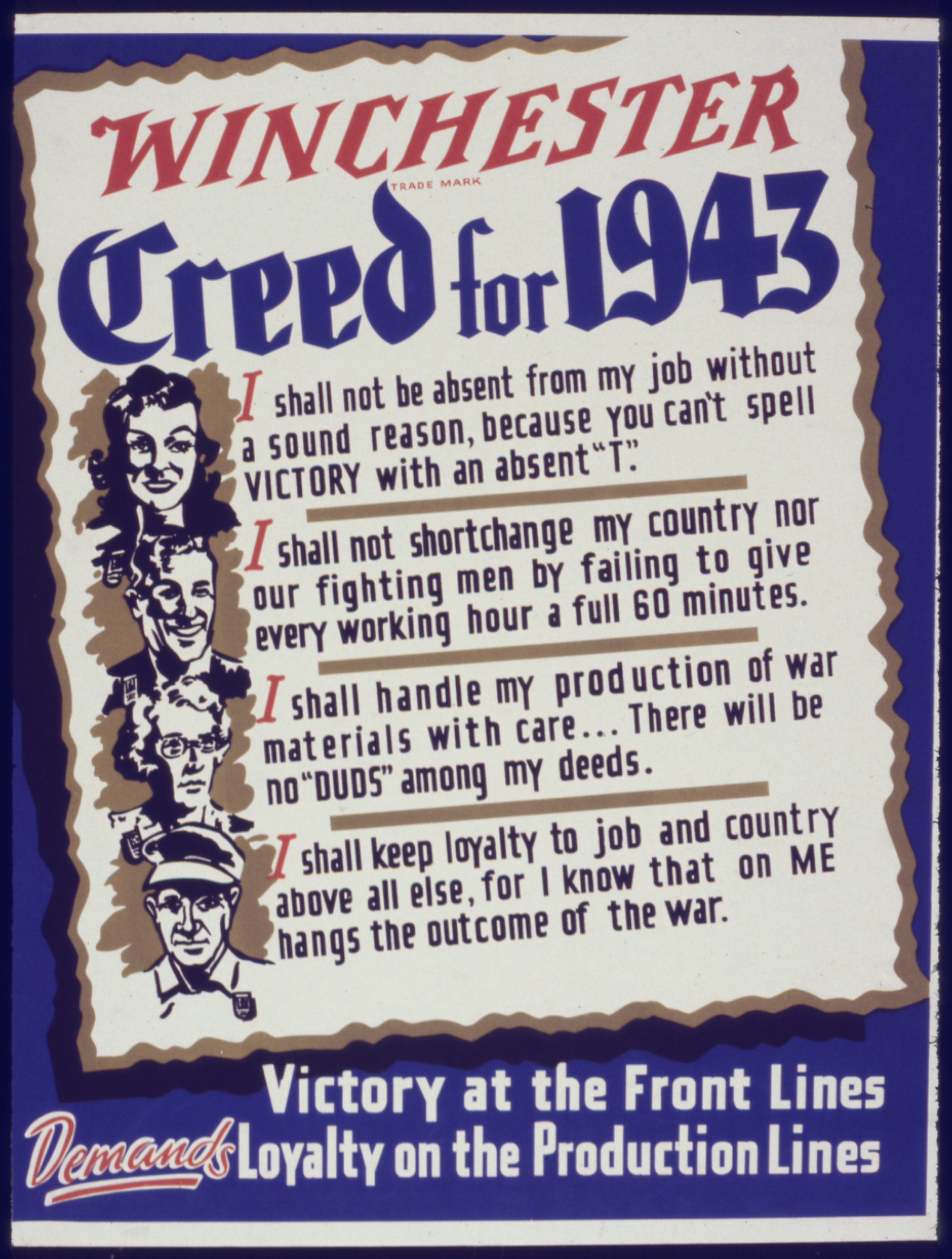
"Winchester Creed for 1943" (propaganda poster from the archives of the War Production Board)

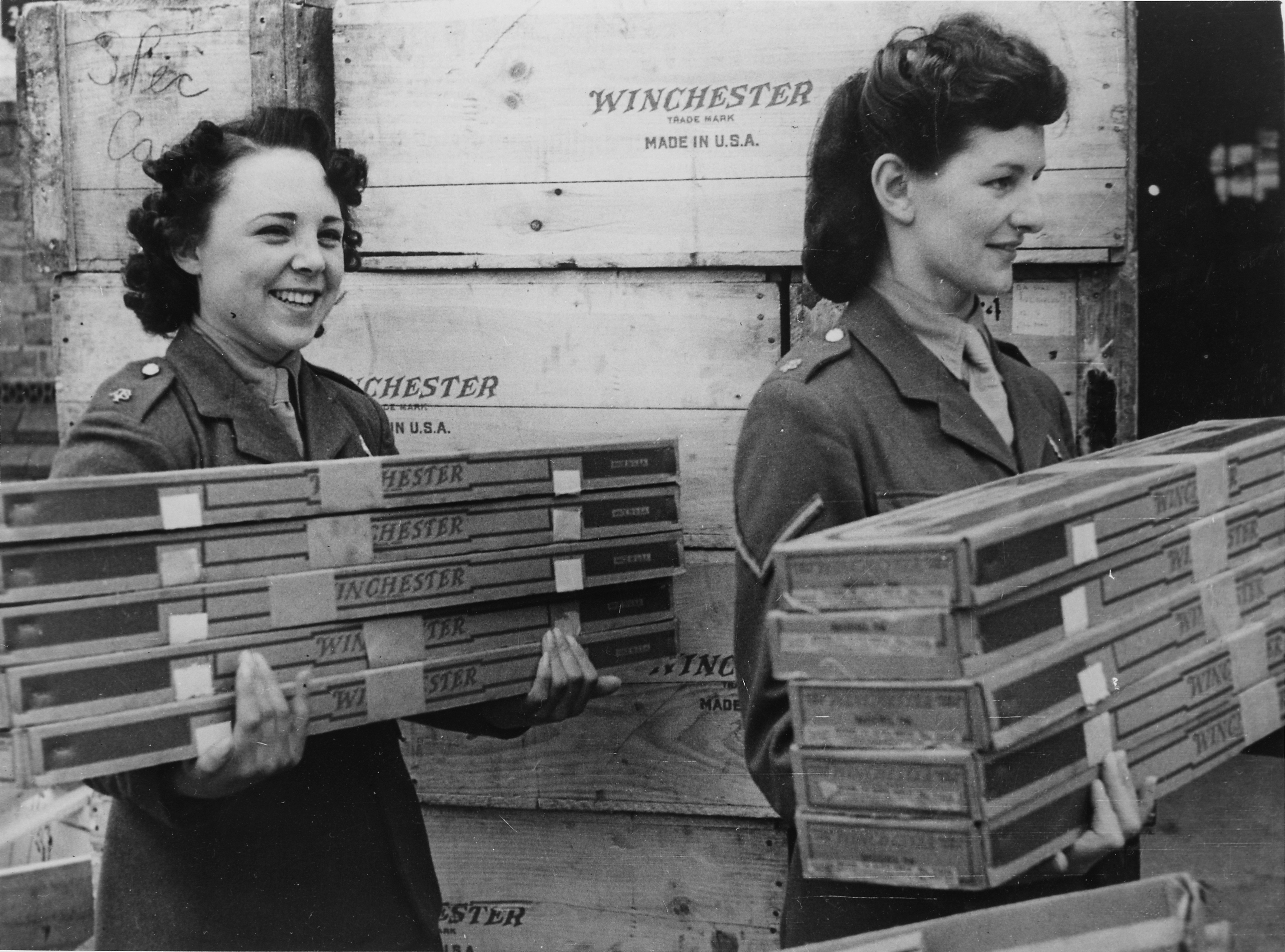
British members of the Auxiliary Territorial Service move Winchester firearms during World War II

The U.S. M1 carbine (technically not a carbine in the sense of a short version of a parent rifle) was designed at Winchester by an eight-man team including Edwin Pugsley, Bill Roemer, Marsh Williams, Fred Humiston, Cliff Warner, and Ralph Clarkson, although the popular press played up the role of ex-convict Williams. More M1 carbines were manufactured by Winchester and other firms than any other U.S. small arm of World War II.

During World War II, Winchester produced the M1 Garand rifle and post-war was the first civilian manufacturer of the M14 rifle.

==== Decline ====
By the 1960s, the rising cost of skilled labor was making it increasingly unprofitable to produce Winchester's classic designs, as they required considerable hand-work to finish. In particular, Winchester's flagship Model 12 pump shotgun and Model 70 bolt-action rifle with their machined forgings could no longer compete in price with Remington's cast-and-stamped 870 and 700. Accordingly, S. K. Janson formed a new Winchester design group to advance the use of "modern" engineering design methods and manufacturing principles in gun design. The result was a new line of guns that replaced most of the older products in 1963–1964. The immediate reaction of the shooting press and public was overwhelmingly negative: the popular verdict was that Winchester had sacrificed quality to the "cheapness experts," and Winchester was no longer considered to be a prestige brand, causing a marked loss of market share. To this day, gun collectors consider "post-64" Winchesters to be both less desirable and less valuable than their predecessors.

In the early 1970s, the Olin Winchester-Western Division tried to diversify with at least two unsuccessful attempts. The first was an experimental indoor shooting range called Wingo in San Diego, California. This short-lived attempt had a strong tie to firearms and ammunition with exclusive guns, ammo, and target launching machines being produced. The flaw was to see it quickly profitable in a western city with too many competing outdoor activities. The second venture was trying to compete with Coleman Company in the camping and sporting goods market. "Trailblazer by Winchester" products included propane-fueled stoves and lanterns. They also produced tents and sleeping bags. These products struggled to compete with similar offerings from an established company founded in 1900.

Labor costs continued to rise through the 1960s and '70s, and a prolonged and bitter strike in 1979–1980 ultimately convinced Olin that firearms could no longer be produced profitably in New Haven. In December 1980, the New Haven plant was sold to its employees, incorporated as the U.S. Repeating Arms Company, and granted a license to make Winchester arms. Olin retained the Winchester ammunition business. U.S. Repeating Arms itself went bankrupt in 1989. After bankruptcy, it was acquired by a French holding company, then sold to Belgian arms makers Herstal Group, which also owns gun makers FN Herstal and Browning Arms Company.

On January 16, 2006, U.S. Repeating Arms announced it was closing its New Haven plant where Winchester rifles and shotguns had been produced for 140 years. Along with the closing of the plant, production of the Model 94 rifle (the descendant of the original Winchester rifle), Model 70 rifle, and Model 1300 shotgun were discontinued. The official press release sent out by U.S. Repeating Arms concerning the closure was released on January 17, 2006. The text is included below:

U.S. Repeating Arms Company To Close New Haven, CT Facility – U.S. Repeating Arms Company, maker of Winchester brand rifles and shotguns will close its New Haven, Connecticut manufacturing facility. Many efforts were made to improve profitability at the manufacturing facility in New Haven, and the decision was made after exhausting all available options.

Effective March 31, 2006, the New Haven manufacturing facility will stop manufacturing the Winchester Model 70, Model 94, and Model 1300.

Winchester Firearms will continue to sell and grow its current line of Select Over & Under shotguns, the new Super X3 autoloading shotgun, the new Super X autoloading rifle, and Limited Edition rifles. The company also plans to introduce new models in the future. There will be no change in Customer Service.

This action is a realignment of resources to make Winchester Firearms a stronger, more viable organization. Winchester Firearms plans to continue the great Winchester legacy and is very excited about the future.

==== Recovery ====
On August 15, 2006, Olin Corporation, owner of the Winchester trademarks, announced that it had entered into a new license agreement with Browning Arms Company to make Winchester brand rifles and shotguns, though not at the closed Winchester plant in New Haven. The production of Model 1885 falling block action, Model 1892 and Model 1886 lever-action rifles are produced under licensed agreement by Miroku Corp. of Japan and imported to the United States by Browning.

In 2008, FN Herstal announced that it would produce Model 70 rifles at its plant in Columbia, South Carolina. In 2013, assembly was moved to Portugal.

In the summer of 2010, FN Herstal resumed production of the Winchester model 1894 and the evolution of the Winchester 1300, now called the Winchester SXP.

A number of gun cleaning kits, Chinese folding knives, tools, and other accessories are also now sold under the Winchester trademark.

==== SXP shotgun recall ====
In April 2015, the company recalled several variants of its SXP-model 12-gauge shotguns that the company says may unintentionally fire while the action is being closed.

== Ammunition ==
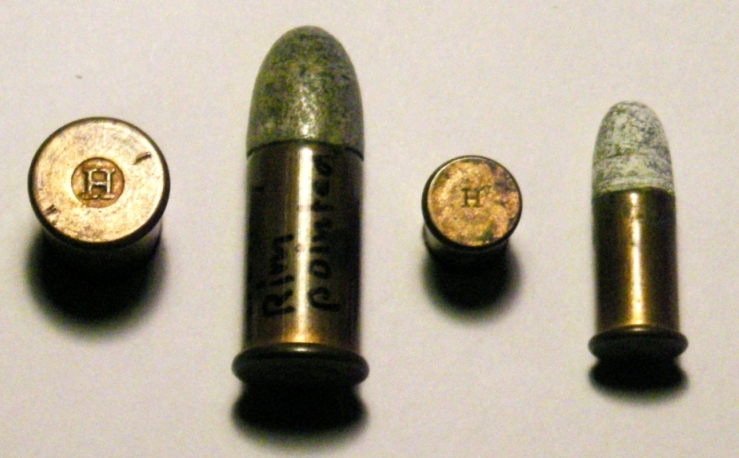
Winchester made rimfire .44 and .32 cartridges

Winchester's Henry and 1866 rifles were designed for the .44 Henry rimfire cartridge. Winchester later introduced many successful cartridge designs, including the .44-40 WCF (Winchester Center Fire), the .30 WCF (.30-30), the .50 BMG, the .270 Winchester, the .308 Winchester, the .243 Winchester, the .22 WMR (.22 Magnum), the .300 Winchester Magnum and the .350 Legend. Their current North America the .30-30 is the best-selling hunting cartridge. The .308 Winchester, the commercial version of the military 7.62×51mm NATO also enjoys widespread use.

Olin Corporation continues to manufacture Winchester ammunition (the cartridge business was not sold to U.S. Repeating Arms) in several lines including Super-X, Supreme and Supreme Elite, AA and Super Target shotshells, and Winchester Cowboy Loads revolver cartridges.

== Presidents ==
- Oliver Winchester (1857–1880).
- William Wirt Winchester (1880–1881), son of Oliver Winchester and husband of Sarah Winchester.
- William Converse (1881–1890), husband of Mary A. Pardee.
- Thomas Grey Bennett (1890–1910), husband of Hannah Jane Winchester.
- George E. Hodson (1910–1915), partner of Oliver in the company.
- Winchester Bennett (1915–1918), son of Thomas Gray Bennett.
- Thomas Grey Bennett (1918–1919), father of Winchester Bennett.
- John Edward Otterson (1919–1924).

== Archives ==
The company's factory collection is owned by the Cody Firearms Museum in Cody, Wyoming.

== See also ==
- Winchester Repeating Arms Company Historic District
- Winchester Rifle
- Benjamin Tyler Henry
- William Mason
- John Browning
- T.C. Johnson
- List of Winchester Models
- Newhallville
- United States Cartridge Company
- Winchester Model 1885 single-shot rifle
- Winchester Model 1886 lever-action rifle
- Winchester Model 1887/1901 lever-action shotgun
- Winchester Model 1894 lever-action rifle
- Winchester Model 1897 slide-action shotgun
- Winchester Model 1903 .22 rifle
- Winchester Model 1912 slide-action hammerless shotgun
- Winchester Model 21 double-barreled shotgun
- Winchester Model 52 bolt-action .22 match rifle
- Winchester Model 54 bolt-action rifle
- Winchester Model 70 bolt-action rifle
- Winchester XPR bolt-action rifle
- Winchester Model 71 lever-action rifle
- Winchester Model 1200 slide-action shotgun
- Winchester '73, the 1950 film
- Antique Guns
- Winchester Mystery House
