= .22 Winchester Automatic =

Rifle cartridge

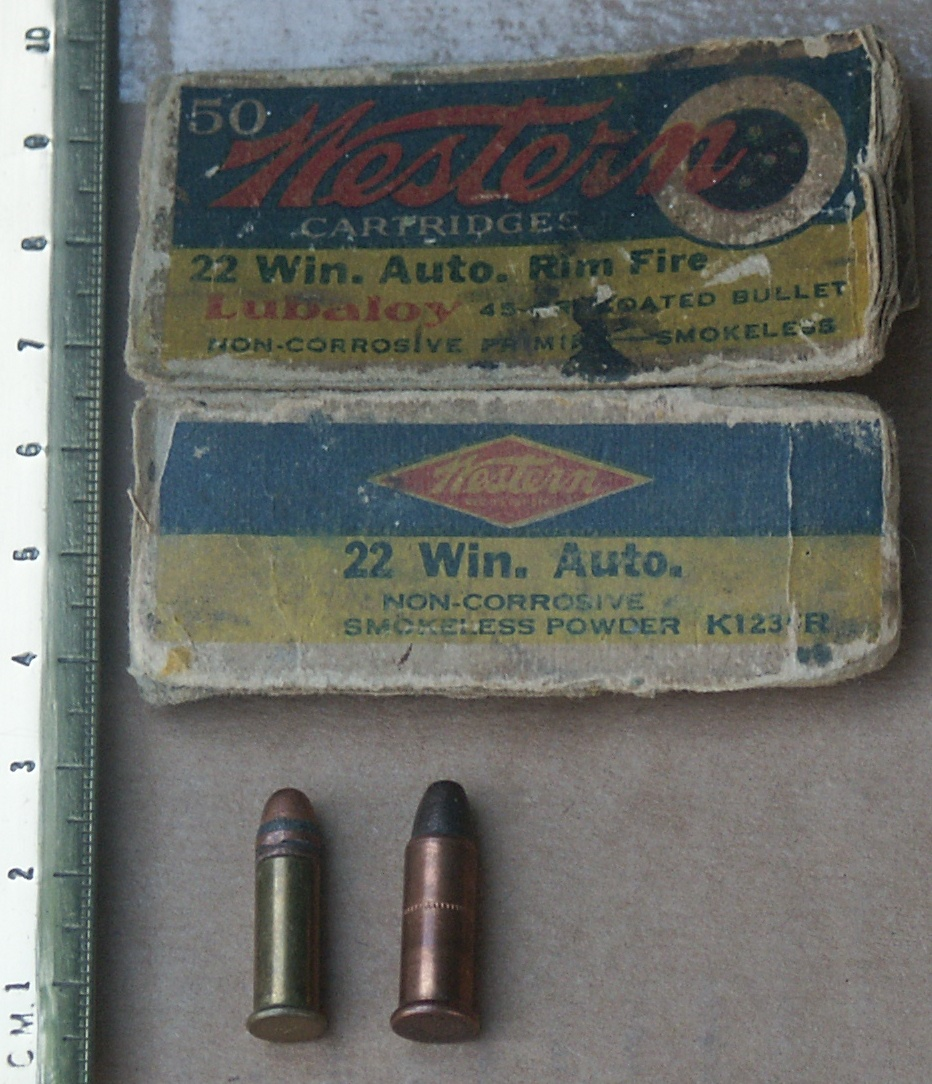
- .22 Winchester Automatic Rimfire cartridge (copper case, right) with .22 Long cartridge (brass case, left) for comparison
- Type: Rifle
- Place of origin: United States

Production history
- Produced: 1903–today

Specifications
- Case type: Rimmed, straight
- Bullet diameter: .222 in (5.6 mm)
- Neck diameter: .250 in (6.4 mm)
- Base diameter: .250 in (6.4 mm)
- Rim diameter: .310 in (7.9 mm)
- Case length: .665 in (16.9 mm)
- Overall length: .915 in (23.2 mm)
- Primer type: Rimfire
- Maximum pressure (CIP): 14,500 psi (100 MPa)

Ballistic performance
Bullet mass/type	Velocity	Energy
45 gr (3 g)	1,055 ft/s (322 m/s)	111 ft⋅lbf (150 J)
45 gr (3 g)	882 ft/s (269 m/s)	78 ft⋅lbf (106 J)
- Test barrel length: 20; Sources: Barnes & Amber 1972

The .22 Winchester Automatic (also known as the .22 Winchester Auto and occasionally .22 Win Auto) is a .22 in (5.6 mm) American rimfire rifle cartridge.

Introduced for the Winchester Model 1903 semiautomatic rifle, the .22 Win Auto was never used in any other firearm. It will not chamber correctly in other .22 rimfire weapons, nor will other .22 rimfire ammunition, including the very dimensionally-similar .22 Remington Automatic, interchange with it. This feature was to prevent use of black powder rounds, which were still popular when it first appeared, from being used in the M1903, resulting in powder residue rapidly clogging the action and rendering the weapon inoperable.

The power of the .22 Win Auto is comparable to the .22 Long rimfire, and while it fires a heavier bullet, it offers no performance edge on either the .22 Long or the very much more common .22 Long Rifle.

== See also ==
- List of cartridges by caliber
- List of rifle cartridges
- List of rimfire cartridges
- 5 mm caliber

== Notes ==
- Barnes, Frank C., ed. by John T. Amber. ".22 Winchester Automatic", in Cartridges of the World, pp. 275, 282, & 283. Northfield, IL: DBI Books, 1972. ISBN 0-695-80326-3.
