= Winchester Model 1912 =

Winchester Model 1912 shotgun
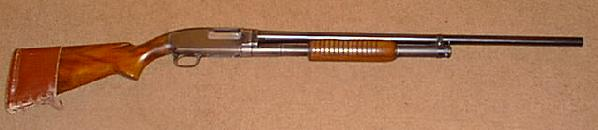
- Winchester Model 12 12-gauge pump-action shotgun manufactured in 1948
- Type: Shotgun
- Place of origin: United States

Service history
- In service: 1912–present
- Used by: United States Army; United States Navy; United States Marine Corps
- Wars: World War I World War II; 1948 Arab-Israeli war (limited); Korean War; Vietnam War

Production history
- Designer: T.C. Johnson; John M. Browning
- Manufacturer: Winchester Repeating Arms Company
- Produced: 1912–1964, with special production runs until 2006
- No. built: nearly 2,000,000
- Variants: See text

Specifications
- Caliber: 12 gauge, 16 gauge, 20 gauge, 28 gauge
- Action: Pump-action, Tilting bolt
- Feed system: 6-rounds tubular magazine +1 in battery (see text for more details)

The Winchester Model 1912, also commonly known as the Winchester 1912, Model 12, or M12, is an internal-hammer (i.e. 'hammerless') pump-action shotgun with an external tube magazine. Popularly named the Perfect Repeater at its introduction, it largely set the standard for pump-action shotguns over its 51-year high-rate production life. From August 1912 until first discontinued by Winchester in May 1964, nearly two million Model 12 shotguns were produced in various grades and barrel lengths. Initially chambered for 20 gauge only, the 12 and 16 gauge versions came out in 1913 (first listed in the 1914 catalogs), and the 28 gauge version came out in 1934. A .410 version was never produced; instead, a scaled-down version of the Model 12 known as the Model 42, directly derived from scaled drawings of the Model 12, was produced in .410.

== Description ==
The Model 1912 (shortened to Model 12 in 1919) was the next step from the Winchester Model 1897 hammer-fired shotgun, which in turn had evolved from the earlier Winchester Model 1893 shotgun. The Model 12 was designed by Winchester engineer T.C. Johnson, and was based in part on the M1893/97 design by John M. Browning, in that it used a sliding forearm or "pump action" to cycle the mechanism and a tilting breechblock. It was initially available in 20 gauge only (12 and 16 gauge guns were not sold until late 1914).

Its tubular magazine was loaded through the bottom of the gun. Empty shotgun shells ejected to the right. Depending on the particular wooden plug installed in the magazine, two, three, or four shells could be loaded into the tubular magazine. The magazine tube held six 2¾-inch 12 gauge shells, whereas most modern sporting shotguns typically hold only four or five shells.

With forged and machined steel parts, the ultimate reason for discontinuation in 1964 was that it was too expensive to produce at a competitive price. The primary competition at this time came from the much less expensive Remington Model 870, which had been introduced in 1950. The majority of "modern" Model 12 shotguns manufactured after 1927 were chambered for 2¾-inch shotgun shells only, although some specialized models such as the Heavy Duck Gun Model 12 were chambered for 3" Super Speed and Super X shells (basically a 3" magnum). The early 20 gauge Model 12 guns had chambers that were 2½", and the 16 gauge Model 12s were chambered for a 2 9/16-inch shotgun shell. To add further confusion, some of these early Model 12s have subsequently been modified, with their chambers lengthened to accept 2¾-inch shotgun shells, while others remain in their factory-stock chamber lengths. Careful inspection by a gunsmith is always recommended to determine whether or not it is safe to fire a modern 2¾-inch shotgun shell in older Model 12s. While a 2¾-inch shell will often chamber in the short chambered Model 12s this will result in excessive pressure upon firing, and the fact that a 2¾-inch shell fits should never be taken as an indication that the chamber has been modified.

Special production examples were produced by Winchester, the U.S. Repeating Arms Company, and Miroku after 1964 through 2006 through specialized gun collector purchase programs, but the Perfect Repeater shotgun was never mass-produced after 1964. The U.S. Repeating Arms Company (a subsidiary of FN) announced a complete closing of the New Haven, Connecticut factory facility in January 2006, thus ending the Model 12's production after 95 years.

== Military use ==
The United States armed forces used various versions of the Model 12 in World War I, World War II, Korea, and in the early part of the Vietnam War, until inventory was exhausted after the Model 12's initial production ceased in 1964. Versions of the Model 12 were type classified as the Model 12 or M12 for short. Approximately 20,000 Model 12 trench guns were purchased by the US Army in World War I, differing from the civilian version by having a shorter barrel, a perforated steel heat shield, and a M1917 bayonet adapter.

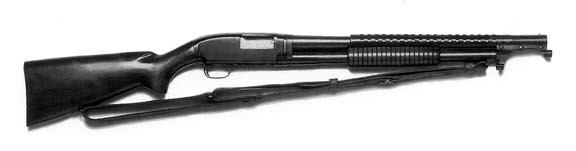
Winchester Model 12 Trench Gun

More than 80,000 Model 12 shotguns were purchased during World War II by the United States Marine Corps, Army Air Forces, and Navy, mostly for use in the Pacific theater. Riot gun versions of the Model 12, lacking the heat shield and bayonet, were purchased by the Army for use in defending bases and in protecting Air Forces aircraft against saboteurs when parked. The Navy similarly purchased and used the riot gun version for protecting Navy ships and personnel while in foreign ports. The Marine Corps used the trench gun version of the Model 12 to great success in taking Japanese-occupied islands in the Pacific. The primary difference between the World War I and the World War II Model 12 trench gun versions was that the original design contained six rows of holes in the perforated heat shield, this was further reduced to only four rows beginning in 1942.

During the Korean War, the Marines used the Model 12 extensively. Likewise, the Marines and U.S. Army used the Model 12 during the Vietnam War. However, production of the Model 12 ended in 1964, which led to the Model 12 no longer being purchased by the military. However, there were numerous firearms already in the American arsenal, and the Model 12 would continue to see combat service until the end of the 1960s. During the middle 1960s, the Ithaca 37 shotgun was acquired for combat use, and it began replacing the Model 12 as the primary shotgun employed by the United States military. The Ithaca 37 eventually became the most commonly used shotgun of the Vietnam War. Other shotguns which were used in that conflict included the Winchester Model 1897 trench gun, the Stevens Model 77 shotgun, and the Remington 870 Wingmaster, the latter of which was used more by the U.S. Navy than other branches.

Unlike most modern pump-action shotguns, the Winchester Model 12 had no trigger disconnector. Like the earlier Winchester Model 1897, it fired each time the action closed as long as the trigger remained depressed from the prior shot. While the trigger remained depressed, as fast as one could pump the action open and closed another round would fire ("slam firing"). That capability and its six shell magazine capacity made it effective for close-combat.

See List of individual weapons of the U.S. Armed Forces

== Users ==
- Greece: Used by 1st Paratroopers Brigade.
- Israel: Limited usage during the 1948 Arab-Israeli war.
- Mandatory Palestine: Limited usage and used in the civilian market.
- Malaysia
- United States

== See also ==
- Combat shotgun
- Riot shotgun
- List of shotguns
- Winchester Model 1897
