= Newhallville =

Neighborhood in New Haven, Connecticut

Newhallville is a neighborhood in the city of New Haven, Connecticut, named for industrialist George Newhall.

As delineated on city planning maps, Newhallville is bordered on the north by the town of Hamden, on the east by Winchester Avenue, on the south by Munson Street, on the southwest by Crescent Street, and on the northwest by Fournier Street. The main through routes are Dixwell Avenue, Shelton Avenue, Winchester Avenue, and Bassett Street. Once home to several industries, the neighborhood is now almost entirely residential. The route of the Farmington Canal runs through the middle of the neighborhood. The former Winchester Repeating Arms factory complex in Newhallville occupies 75 acres (30 ha) in the neighborhood. It is now the site of Science Park at Yale, an initiative started in 1981 by Yale University, the City of New Haven, and the Olin Corporation to utilize and redevelop the sites and buildings where the former Winchester Repeating Arms factory was once located. The southern part of the neighborhood (south of Hazel and Highland streets) and the northern part of the adjacent Dixwell neighborhood are listed on the National Register of Historic Places as the Winchester Repeating Arms Company Historic District, bounded on the south by Charles, Admiral, and Sachem streets.

== History ==
The Newhallville area was a rural farming area until the middle of the 19th century. The Farmington Canal was built through the area in the late 1820s, but it did not bring the development that its promoters had hoped for. In the early 1850s the canal was converted to a railroad line, and George Newhall established a small factory near the railroad where he manufactured carriages. Other small factories followed, along with workers' houses and a boarding house that Newhall built in 1860 for his unmarried male employees.

In 1870, the Winchester Repeating Arms Company began operations in Newhallville, which became its headquarters and center of production. By 1887, Winchester's factory employed more than 600 people. By the early 20th century, the plant covered more than six city blocks and employed more than 1,000 workers. The manufacturing complex reached its peak of activity during World War II, when it employed more than 19,000 people.

As Winchester continued to expand during the late 19th century and early 20th century, the land surrounding the Winchester plant was developed as housing for industrial workers, primarily in one-, two-, and three-family tenement homes. Population density near the factory was high because close-in housing was preferred by workers who typically walked to and from their places of work. Many houses in the area were built by real estate investors who built houses for rental or to be sold on speculation. During the period 1870 through 1920, some 65 to 75 percent of the households in the vicinity of the Winchester plant had at least one primary breadwinner working for Winchester, while workers in another five to eight percent were employed in other neighborhood industrial concerns, and workers in roughly two to three percent of households were engaged in ancillary commercial business activities (such as butchers, grocers, and barbers).

Industrial activity in Newhallville was reduced drastically after 1965, when Winchester, at that time the largest employer in New Haven, decided to move its main production line to East Alton, Illinois. After a machinists' strike in the late 1970s, the plant was sold to U.S. Repeating Arms. The neighborhood's long history of arms production finally ended completely in 2006, when the U.S. Repeating Arms factory closed, laying off 186 workers.
