= Winchester Model 1903 =

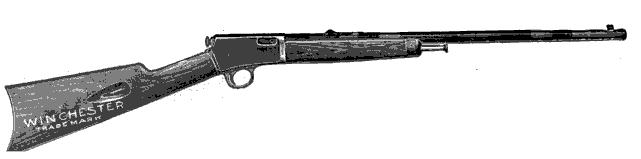
- Type: Semi-automatic rifle
- Place of origin: United States

Production history
- Designer: T. C. Johnson
- Manufacturer: Winchester Repeating Arms Company
- Produced: 1903 to 1932
- No. built: 126,000
- Variants: "Plain" and "Fancy Finish" rifles

Specifications
- Mass: 6 lb (2.7 kg) to 7 lb (3.2 kg)
- Length: 37 in (940 mm)
- Barrel length: 20 in (510 mm)
- Cartridge: .22 Winchester Automatic
- Action: Blowback
- Rate of fire: Semi-automatic
- Feed system: 10-round tube magazine
- Sights: Open iron sights and optional tang or receiver-mounted aperture sights

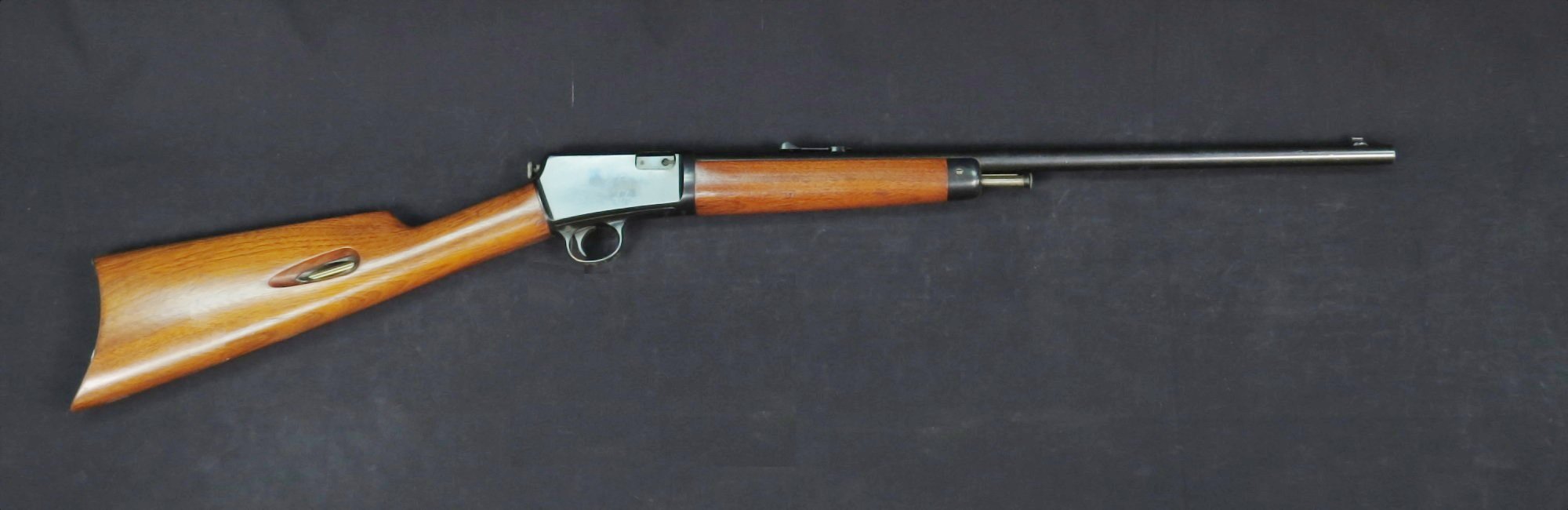

The Winchester Model 1903 was the first commercially available semi-automatic firearm made by the Winchester Repeating Arms Company.

== History ==
The Winchester Model 1903 was designed by T.C. Johnson, who had joined Winchester in 1885 and had become nationally known as an inventor of successful rifles. It was first chambered for the .22 Winchester Automatic cartridge.

In 1919, the Model 1903 moniker was shortened to Model 03, and following a partial redesign in the 1930s, was renamed the Model 63. In addition to other changes, the model fired the .22 Long Rifle cartridge. This cartridge was more popular than the .22 Winchester Automatic cartridge, and was demanded by customers.

The Model 63 was first available for purchase in 1933 and remained in production until 1958.

Production totaled approximately 126,000 Model 1903 rifles and approximately 175,000 Model 63 rifles.

== Design and Features ==
The Model 1903/Model 63 featured a 20-inch (510 mm) round barrel. A 23-inch (580 mm) barrel was approved for manufacturing in 1933, and the 20-inch (510 mm) barrel was discontinued in 1936.

The Model 1903/Model 63 had a tubular magazine in the butt stock. The magazine held ten cartridges, and was loaded through a slot in the right side of the butt stock.

The Model 1903 and Model 63 were takedown rifles. The takedown mechanism on the Model 1903 required the user to press the takedown screw-lock down through a slot in the tang to release the lock from the ratchet. The Model 63 featured an improved mechanism that required the user to simply turn the takedown screw to the left until the mechanism released.

The self-loading feature of the Model 1903/Model 63 was accomplished by use of a simple blow-back operated mechanism. This mechanism featured a balanced breech bolt, meaning that the breech bolt contained a quantity of metal proportioned to the weight and velocity of the bullet. This balances the recoil forces so that the breech bolt does not move rearward until the bullet has left the muzzle of the barrel, and therefore allows the bullet to be fired with no loss of energy. The original design of this self-loading mechanism required Winchester to design a custom cartridge (the .22 Winchester Automatic) to go along with it. This mechanism was redesigned for the Model 63 to allow it to fire the .22 Long Rifle cartridge, which by then had become much more popular.

The Model 1903 was advertised as an "automatic rifle". In modern times, it is more appropriately referred to as a semi-automatic rifle since the loading mechanism required the trigger to be pulled for each shot.

== Variants ==
The Model 1903 was available in a "standard" and a "deluxe" version (also called "plain" and "fancy" versions). The standard version had a plain walnut stock with a plain straight grip. The deluxe version had a checkered walnut pistol grip stock with a checkered forearm. A tubular magazine located in the buttstock held ten cartridges.

The first 5000 rifles were produced without a safety mechanism. After this, a cross-bolt safety was added. The Model 63, introduced in 1933, was chambered for the popular and widely available .22 Long Rifle cartridge. It was initially made with a 20" barrel, then with a 23" barrel from 1936 until the end of production in 1958. About 175,000 Model 63 rifles were manufactured, with the last 10,000 having grooved receiver tops for scope mounting.
