= U.S. Repeating Arms Company =

American firearms company (1981–1989)

- Company type: Private
- Industry: Firearms
- Founded: 1857
- Defunct: 1989 (bankruptcy)
- Fate: Taken over by Fabrique Nationale Herstal
- Headquarters: New Haven, Connecticut, U.S.
- Area served: Worldwide
- Products: Rifles, shotguns

The U.S. Repeating Arms Company (USRAC) was an American manufacturer of firearms. It was established in April 1857 and operated as an independent company until 1989, when it went bankrupt and was taken over by Fabrique Nationale Herstal. The company traced its origins to the Winchester Repeating Arms Company, which was famous for making Winchester rifles.

== History ==
In 1866, Oliver Winchester reorganized the New Haven Arms Company and changed its name to the Winchester Repeating Arms Company. In 1931, the Western Cartridge Company (forerunner of the Olin Corporation) purchased Winchester Repeating Arms and subsequently merged with it to form the Winchester-Western Company.

In 1981, the U.S. Repeating Arms Company was established by Winchester employees to purchase the rights to manufacture Winchester-branded rifles and shotguns in New Haven, Connecticut, under license from Olin. Production of ammunition and cartridge components under the Winchester Ammunition Inc. name were retained by Olin and not licensed to USRAC.

In 1989, after the bankruptcy of USRAC, it was taken over by Fabrique Nationale Herstal (FN), a Belgium-based international group producing firearms.

In early 2006, it was announced that the factory in New Haven would close. Production of several Winchester rifles would cease worldwide, while some models would be continued at factories outside the United States. This later changed, as according to the FN website, Winchester-branded guns are still being produced by FN in both the U.S. and Belgium.

== Factory in Newhallville ==
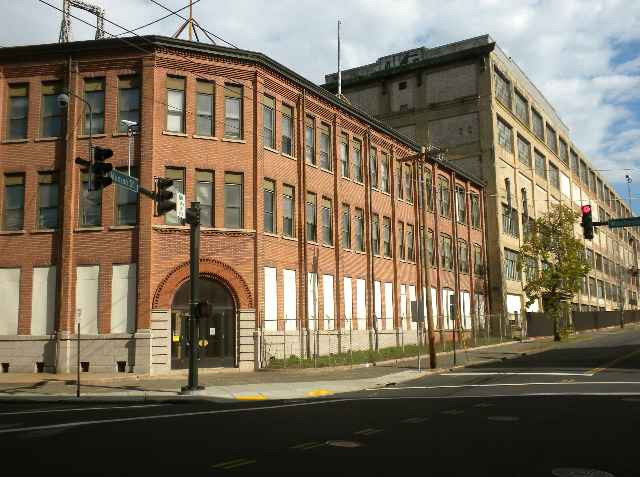
The former factory in Newhallville

Industrial activity in Newhallville was reduced drastically after 1965 when Winchester, at that time the largest employer in New Haven, decided to move its main production line to East Alton, Illinois. After a machinists' strike in the late 1970s, the factory was sold to U.S. Repeating Arms. The neighborhood's long history of arms production finally ended completely in 2006, when the U.S. Repeating Arms factory closed, laying off 186 workers.

== See also ==
- Winchester Repeating Arms Company Historic District
