= Winchester Model 21 =

- Type: Shotgun
- Place of origin: United States

Production history
- Manufacturer: Winchester
- Produced: 1931–1959 (Original Production); 1960–1991 (Custom Production)
- No. built: 30,000

Specifications
- Cartridge: 12, 16, 20, 28 gauge, and .410 bore
- Barrels: 2
- Action: Break-Action
- Feed system: Manual, break open action

The Winchester Model 21 is a deluxe side by side shotgun. The shotgun's initial production run from 1931 through 1959 yielded approximately 30,000 guns. Winchester Repeating Arms Company ceased the main production line of this shotgun in 1960 and the Model 21 was sourced to the Winchester Custom Shop until the gun's retirement in 1991. New Winchester Model 21 production continues under license to Connecticut Shotgun Manufacturing Company.

The Winchester Model 21 action is of a typical breech loading shotgun, commonly called a break or hinge action. Like all quality double guns, production is time-consuming due to the laborious process of joining the barrels to produce an identical convergence of shot. The Model 21 was Winchester's effort to make a quality side by side shotgun to rival those of high-end makers such as Parker and Fox; financial troubles plagued the gun's development until the Western Cartridge Company purchased Winchester Repeating Arms in 1931. The Model 21 has a considerable collectors following as it is regarded as almost a custom-made shotgun.

== Production from 1931–1959 ==
Model 21 grades at this time were chambered in 12, 16, and 20 gauge. The .410 bore was offered in Custom Grade only and is extremely rare only exceeded by the rare (8 known) 28 gauge guns produced. Barrel lengths were offered from 26 inches to 32 inches. The undersides of the trigger plates were typically stamped with the name of the grade.

-Standard- This grade included barrels with a matte or vented rib, select grade walnut stocks featured in a straight or pistol grip configuration.

-Tournament- Produced from 1933–1944. Identical to the standard grade except with the trigger plate being stamped "TOURNAMENT."

-Tournament Skeet- Produced from 1933–1936. The trigger plate is stamped "TOURNAMENT SKEET."

-Trap- A higher grade tournament gun with higher quality wood and a stock made to a customer's dimensions. The trigger plate is marked "TRAP."

-Skeet- Identical to Trap grade, but available in 28 gauge (8 known to exist). The trigger plate marked as "SKEET."

-Duck/Magnum- These grades were offered with features found in the Standard grade. The Duck variant built from 1940–1952, was chambered only for 12 gauge 3 inch shells and featured the trigger plate marked "DUCK." The Magnum version was offered from 1953–1959 in both 12 and 20 gauge, with 3 inch chambers. This Magnum grade featured no trigger plate markings.

-Custom/Deluxe- This particular grade included a stock which was custom fit to the customer. The top rib was marked "CUSTOM BUILT" and the bottom trigger plate was marked "DELUXE."

== Custom Shop Production 1960–1991 ==
Model 21 grades were offered in 12, 16, 20, 28 gauge, and .410 bore with 16 gauge being the rarest. Barrels were produced in lengths from 26 inches to 32 inches. Select engraved models were available in 6 different patterns, with a higher number indicating more embellished engraving.

- Custom Grade- Grade includes a matte center rib, a choice of a straight or pistol grip stock with fancy walnut and a checkered stock with matching fore end.

- Pigeon Grade- Identical to the above but this grade offers a matte or ventilated center rib, a higher quality stock with custom leather recoil pad, matching fore end, and a gold engraved pistol grip cap. The receiver was engraved with the number 6 pattern. This grade was dropped in 1982

- Grand American- Identical to the Pigeon grade, except the receiver was engraved with in the number 6 pattern with gold inlays. This grade was shipped with one extra set of barrels of the same gauge and fore end in its own leather trunk case.

- Grand American Small Gauge- This grade was first offered in 1982, and shipped with both a 28 gauge and .410 bore barrel set, with matching fore ends.

== Resources ==
- http://www.winchestercollector.org/guns/model21.shtml
