= Winchester Model 54 =

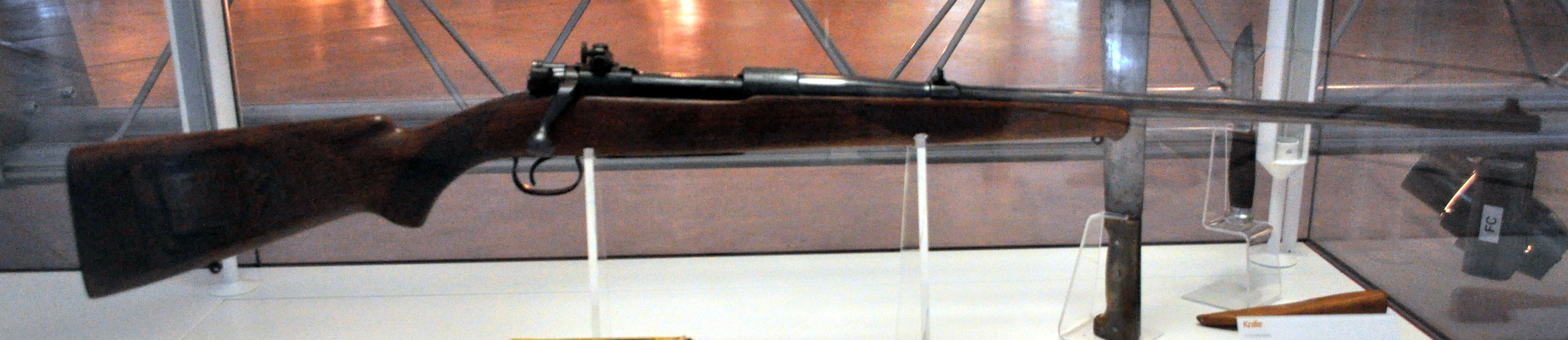
- Type: Bolt-action rifle
- Place of origin: United States

Production history
- Designer: Thomas Crosley Johnson
- Manufacturer: Winchester Repeating Arms Company
- Produced: 1925–1936
- No. built: 50,145
- Variants: Standard Grade, Carbine, Super Grade, Target

Specifications
- Mass: 7¾ lb. (Standard Grade, 24 in. barrel), 11¾ lb. (Sniper's Rifle), 8 lb. (Super Grade), 7¼ lb. (Carbine)
- Cartridge: Various, see article
- Barrels: 24 in. (Standard Grade), 20 in. (Carbine), 26 in. heavy (Sniper's Rifle)
- Action: Bolt
- Feed system: Non-detachable box magazine, holding 5 cartridges
- Sights: Open

The Winchester Model 54 is a bolt-action rifle manufactured by the Winchester Repeating Arms Company. The 54 was the first successful production run civilian centerfire bolt action for Winchester.

Using a Mauser 98-type action, the Model 54 was produced until 1936 when, with some modifications, it was reintroduced as the Winchester Model 70. The Model 54 had a relatively heavy two stage trigger pull, which was greatly improved in the Model 70.

Standard chamberings included the .22 Hornet, .220 Swift, .250-3000 Savage, .257 Roberts, .270 Winchester, 30-30 Winchester, .30-06 Springfield, 7x57mm Mauser, 7.65x53mm Argentine, and 7.92x57mm Mauser. Special order chamberings were made in .25-35 Winchester, .32 Winchester Special, .35 Whelen, and 38-55 Winchester.

Intended for use with open or aperture sights, the bolt throw makes the addition of a scope difficult as it was introduced prior to the popularity of telescopic sight.

== See also ==
- Winchester rifle
- T. C. Johnson
