= Winchester Model 1911 =

Winchester Model 1911 Self Loading shotgun
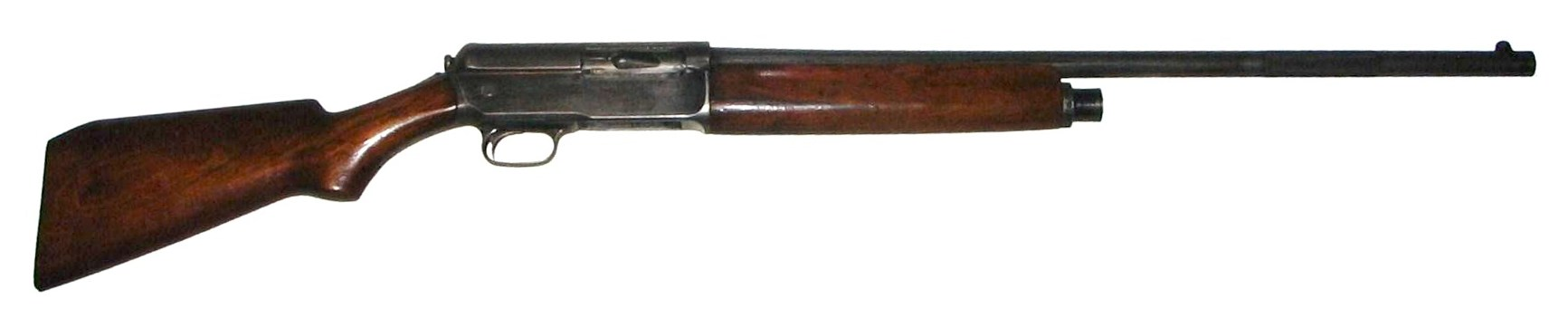
- Winchester Model 1911
- Type: Shotgun
- Place of origin: United States

Production history
- Designer: Thomas Crossley Johnson
- Manufacturer: Winchester Repeating Arms Company
- Produced: 1911–1925
- Variants: See text

Specifications
- Caliber: 12 gauge, 16 gauge, 20 gauge, 28 gauge
- Action: Long recoil
- Feed system: 5-round tubular magazine
- Sights: Bead

The Winchester Model 1911 SL Shotgun was a self-loading, recoil-operated shotgun produced by the Winchester Repeating Arms Company from 1911 to 1925. It was Winchester's first autoloading shotgun, but design flaws kept it from providing competition for the autoloading shotguns made by Remington Arms and Browning Arms Company.

== Description and development ==
The Model 1911 SL (for "Self-Loading") shotgun was developed in 1911 by Thomas Crossley Johnson for the Winchester Repeating Arms Corporation. At the time, Winchester lacked an autoloading shotgun in its product offering, since the company had not accepted John Browning's conditions (he wanted to be paid on a royalty basis, without giving up his rights) for taking his 1898 autoloading design in production. The weapon rejected by Winchester was to become the Browning Auto-5 shotgun (also license-built as the Remington Model 11 and the Savage 720), and set the standard for autoloading shotgun designs until after World War II.

Due to patent restrictions on the 1898 design, Winchester was unable to copy the Browning design they had rejected earlier, the only autoloading shotgun design at the time, so Winchester had to adapt the design for their own production without infringing on Browning's patents; T.C. Johnson, reportedly, joked that "it took him nearly ten years to design an automatic shotgun (the Winchester 1911) which would not be an infringement on the Browning gun." One of Browning's patents was for the charging handle on the bolt of the 1905 shotgun which disconnected the bolt from the barrel; Winchester worked around this restriction by buying an early production Auto-5 from Browning and literally adding ribs to the barrel so it could be used to charge the weapon. In order to use the 1911 SL, a user would place the gun on safe, point the firearm in a safe direction, load the tubular magazine, and then pull back on the barrel by the checkered section. After disengaging the safety, the weapon was ready to fire.

The stock can be laminated with 3 separate lengthwise pieces glued together.

== Design and safety flaws ==
The novel method of charging the 1911 could be potentially lethal if done incorrectly. Shotgun cartridges of the time were often made of paper, which could make the cartridge body vulnerable to expansion when exposed to moisture in large quantities. If this happened in the 1911, the barrel would have to be cycled in order to open the chamber so that the swollen shotgun shell could be removed. Some users mistakenly cycled the barrel by placing the butt of the weapon against the ground and forcing the barrel down. In this position, the muzzle of the weapon would be pointing towards the face of the user, and the swelled shell could fire, injuring or killing the user. This safety issue led to the Model 1911 being nicknamed "the Widowmaker". This situation could be avoided with adherence to safety procedures common to handling firearms, in particular, the practice of keeping the weapon pointed in a safe direction at all times.

The potential for slam fire when clearing jams was not the only flaw in the 1911's design. The system of buffer rings used to reduce the recoil (two fiber washers) when the weapon was fired often failed. The breakdown of these rings greatly increased the recoil when a round was fired. The gun's "hammering recoil" caused many a stock to split.

The sales of the "mechanically ill-fated" weapon lagged significantly behind those of Remington's and Browning's autoloaders, and Winchester ceased its production in 1925, after producing almost 83,000 of them. As recently as 2005, four people were injured in just one incident with the 1911 while loading or clearing the weapon.
