= FN Browning Group =

Belgian arms manufacturer

FN Browning Group S.A.
- Type: Private
- Industry: Firearms
- Predecessor: Fabrique Nationale; Browning International
- Founded: 1889; 137 years ago
- Headquarters: Herstal, Liège, Liège, Wallonia, Belgium
- Key people: Julien Compère (CEO); Baudouin de Hepcée(CFO)
- Products: Firearms, ammunitions, accessories, optoelectronics, clothing
- Brands: FN Herstal; Browning; Winchester; Miroku; Accuracy International
- Revenue: ▲€907 million (2023)
- Net income: ▲€75 million (2023)
- Owner: Walloon Region
- Number of employees: >3,000 (2023)
- Website: fnbrowninggroup.com

The FN Browning Group, formerly known as the Herstal Group, is the parent company of the small arms manufacturers FN Herstal and Browning Arms Company, which market the Browning, Winchester and FN brands. It is headquartered in Liège, Belgium with offices in the United States, the United Kingdom, Finland, Portugal and France. FN Browning Group is also a shareholder in the Japanese company, Miroku Co., Ltd.

== History ==
Since 1997, FN Browning Group has been 100% owned by the Walloon Region of Belgium, who purchased the remaining shares from GIAT.

On 15 June 2024, Herstal Group changed its name to FN Browning Group.

On September 30, 2025, FN Browning Group announced its acquisition of Sofisport, a Paris-based ammunition manufacturer specializing in shotshells and ammunition for hunting and sporting use.

FN Browning Group has officially announced a strategic acquisition agreement to acquire Accuracy International, the UK-based global specialist in precision bolt-action rifle systems.
