= Wingo (shooting) =

Wingo was an experimental indoor wing shooting sport invented by the Winchester-Western Division of the Olin Corporation in the early 1970s. The only Wingo facility built was in San Diego, California and was in operation during 1971. It was a family friendly sport enjoyed by men, women and children. Competing teams were organized into leagues. Many area businesses formed teams to compete with one and another. Individual play was also available. The building was purpose built for the new sport and luxurious in its appointments. It contained a service and concession area, a restaurant and two sunken lounges with seating and color slide shows of sporting activities. It had a large parking lot and a very large sign with the "Wingo" logo only. This created a natural curiosity about what it was to passing motorists. The cost of a 10 shot game was one dollar. Popular Science published an article in the February 1971 issue titled ”Indoor Wingshooting Is Here” about Wingo.

The equipment consisted of a bank of 18 machines that created 4-inch-diameter (100 mm) hollow spheres of ice. One of the original machines is in the collection of the Buffalo Bill Historical Center. The player had a custom-made .20 caliber lever action shotgun that was about the same size and weight as a .22 caliber rifle. The choice of calibre was to prevent players from bringing their own .22 caliber shells from outside. The Wingo shot shell was brass with a crimped end and a "w" stamped on the base. It was 24.81mm in length, 5.36mm in case diameter and 6.94mm in rim diameter at base. It was loaded with 119 lead pellets of #12 shot and produced a 30" pattern at 50 feet. The rimfire ammunition was produced by Olin in boxes of 30 or 36 shells with the Wingo logo. The gun was tethered to the shooting bench to prevent it from being pointed toward spectators and to facilitate the wiring for the internal microphone that detected when the gun was fired. The gun was also wired to only fire when the ice target was launched. The gun weighed in at 5.5 pounds and was 38″ in length. It had a "Kwik-Point" scope for quick and easy targeting. Only about 20 of these smooth barrell guns were made and they are now very rare collector's items.

In the game, four-inch-diameter hollow spheres of ice were fired toward the shooter from one of five ports (arranged as #5 is on dice) from a distance of 75 feet. There was an electronic control panel on each shooting lane. It was a black box with multiple colored buttons. The opposing team or person would select which of the five ports that the ice targets would launch from, a time delay, the ice targets trajectory and the speed up to 30 miles per hour. If you wanted to play alone you could set the control panel to "automatic random" launch. The control panel also gave the players automatic scoring based upon a combination of target breaks and elapsed time between launch and hit. When the player fired the gun a number from 1 to 10 was presented by the scoring machine. The number depended on how quickly the player fired, higher numbers for quicker reactions. If the player hit the sphere, he/she scored the number presented by the scoring machine. Wingo gave out award pins for high game and other achievements.

Winchester conducted the trial in San Diego, rather than a Midwest city where shooting sports were more popular, because they wanted to see if it would catch on in a city where there was an abundance of pastimes. The sport was not financially successful and the Wingo facility was closed in less than a year. The facility is now a branch of the San Diego Superior Court.

== See also ==
- Shooting sports
