= Wingo (surname) =

Wingo is a surname. Notable people with the surname include:

- Ajume Wingo, Cameroonian political and social philosopher
- Al Wingo (1898–1964), American baseball player
- Blair Wingo (born 1984), model, actress, and Christian spoken word artist
- Donnie Wingo (born 1960), NASCAR crew chief
- Ed Wingo (1895–1964), Canadian baseball player
- Effiegene Locke Wingo (1883–1962), U.S. Representative from Arkansas
- Harthorne Wingo (born 1947), American basketball player
- Henry Wingo, American soccer player
- Ivey Wingo (1890–1941), American baseball player
- Mekhi Wingo (born 2003), American football player
- Otis Wingo (1877–1930), U.S. Representative from Arkansas's 4th congressional district
- Plennie L. Wingo (1895–1993), walked backwards from Santa Monica, California to Istanbul, Turkey
- Rich Wingo (born 1956), American football player
- Ryan Wingo (born 2006), American football player
- Scott Wingo (born 1989), American baseball player
- Trey Wingo (born 1963), sports broadcaster

== See also ==
- Vingoe, surname of Cornish origin
