= .303/22 =

Rifle cartridge

.303/.22
- Type: Rifle
- Place of origin: Australia

Production history
- Designed: 1930s
- Variants: Wasp, Varment R., Sprinter, Shannon, Epps, Rocket

Specifications
- Parent case: .303 British
- Case type: Rimmed, bottleneck
- Bullet diameter: 0.224 in (5.7 mm)
- Neck diameter: 0.260 in (6.6 mm)
- Shoulder diameter: 0.412 in (10.5 mm)
- Base diameter: 0.460 in (11.7 mm)
- Rim diameter: 0.540 in (13.7 mm)
- Rim thickness: .064 in (1.6 mm)
- Case length: 2.185 in (55.5 mm)
- Overall length: 2.8 in (71 mm)
- Case capacity: 50.86 gr H_{2}O (3.296 cm^{3})
- Rifling twist: 1-12 inches
- Primer type: Large rifle

Ballistic performance
Bullet mass/type	Velocity	Energy
45 gr (3 g) HP	3,500 ft/s (1,100 m/s)	1,224 ft⋅lbf (1,660 J)
50 gr (3 g) SP	3,250 ft/s (990 m/s)	1,173 ft⋅lbf (1,590 J)
55 gr (4 g) SP	3,050 ft/s (930 m/s)	1,136 ft⋅lbf (1,540 J)

The .303/22, sometimes known as the .22/303, is a wildcat centrefire rifle cartridge based on the .303 British, necked down to fire a .224 projectile, originating in Australia in the 1930s as a cartridge for sporterised rifles, particularly on the Lee–Enfield action. Similar versions also appeared in Canada around the same time.

The .303/22 was very popular for a number of reasons, one being that the .22 caliber was better suited to small game than the .303, the rifles were cheap and plentiful, and in New South Wales ownership of military cartridges was severely restricted. Several versions existed, including the full length Falcon, the shortened Sprinter, the even shorter Wasp, the Varmint-R, and many others. Although Lee–Enfields were the most common, conversion of other rifles mostly suited to rimmed cartridges such as P14 Enfield, Martini–Enfield, 1885 and 1895 Winchesters were often seen, as well as 98 and 96 Mausers.

Loaded ammunition and brass was produced by the Super Cartridge Company, Riverbrand, ICI and Sportco, some using new Boxer primed cases, others using military Berdan primed cases. Cases can be formed simply by necking down .303 British brass available from Remington, Federal, Winchester, Sellier & Bellot and others. Reloading dies are made by most larger manufacturers, like RCBS, CH and Simplex.

== Variants ==
- 303/22 Wasp 1.97"
- 303/22 Varment R. 2.031"
- 303/22 Sprinter 2.100"
- 303/22 2.185"
- 303/22 Shannon 2.222"
- 303/22 Rocket (a.k.a. 22/4000), unknown case length

== See also ==
- .22-06
- .303/25
- Lee–Enfield
- List of rifle cartridges
- Sporterising
