= List of Winchester Center Fire cartridges =

List of Winchester Center Fire rifle cartridges. More commonly known as WCF, it is a family of cartridges designed by Winchester Repeating Arms Company. There are many other Winchester cartridges that do not carry the WCF moniker, such as the .300 WSM. .270 Winchester, and .300 Winchester Magnum

== Cartridges ==
- .22 WCF
- .25-20 WCF - ".25 WCF"
- .25-35 WCF
- .30 WCF - ".30-30"
- .307 Winchester
- .32 Winchester Special - ".32 Special"
- .32 Winchester Self-Loading - ".32 WSL"
- .32 WCF - "32-20"
- .32-40 WCF - ".32-40 Ballard"
- .33 WCF - ".33 Win"
- .348 WCF
- .35 Winchester - ".35 Win"
- .35 Winchester Self-Loading - ".35 WSL"
- .351 Winchester Self-Loading - ".351 WSL"
- .356 Winchester
- .358 Winchester
- .375 Winchester - ".375 Win"
- .38-40 WCF
- .38-55 WCF - ".38-55 Ballard"
- .38-56 WCF
- .38-70 WCF
- .38-72 WCF
- .40-82 WCF
- .40-110 WCF
- .40-60 WCF
- .40-65 WCF
- .40-70 WCF
- .40-72 WCF
- .40-82 WCF
- .405 WCF
- .44-40 WCF
- .45-60 WCF
- .45-75 WCF
- .45-90 WCF - ".45-90 Sharps"
- .50-110 WCF
- .50-95 WCF
- .70-150 Winchester

== See also ==
- List of cartridges by caliber
- List of handgun cartridges
- List of rebated rim cartridges
- List of rimfire cartridges
- Cartridge (firearms)
- Table of pistol and rifle cartridges (by year)
- Winchester Short Magnum or WSM
- Winchester Super Short Magnum or WSSM
