= .405 Winchester =

Rifle cartridge

.405 Winchester Center Fire
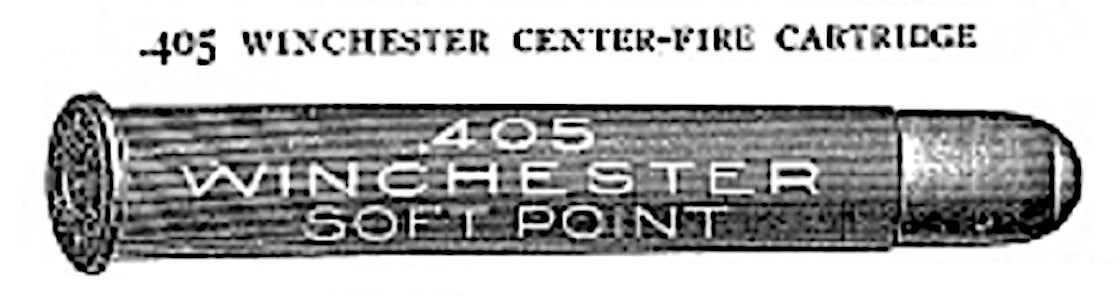
- Type: Rifle
- Place of origin: United States

Production history
- Designer: Winchester Repeating Arms Company
- Designed: 1904
- Produced: 1904–present
- Variants: .277 Elliott Express.357 Elliott Express

Specifications
- Case type: Rimmed, straight
- Bullet diameter: 0.4115 in (10.45 mm)
- Neck diameter: 0.436 in (11.1 mm)
- Base diameter: 0.461 in (11.7 mm)
- Rim diameter: 0.543 in (13.8 mm)
- Case length: 2.583 in (65.6 mm)
- Overall length: 3.175 in (80.6 mm)
- Rifling twist: 1 turn in 14"
- Primer type: large rifle
- Maximum pressure (CIP): 35,500 psi (245 MPa)
- Maximum pressure (SAAMI): 46,000 psi (320 MPa)
- Maximum CUP: 36,000 CUP

Ballistic performance
Bullet mass/type	Velocity	Energy
300 gr (19 g)	2,204 ft/s (672 m/s)	3,236 ft⋅lbf (4,387 J)
400 gr (26 g)	1,900 ft/s (580 m/s)	3,207 ft⋅lbf (4,348 J)
- Source(s): The American Rifle Woodleigh Bullets Loading Manual

The .405 Winchester / 10.45x65mmR (.405 WCF) is a rimmed centerfire rifle cartridge introduced in 1904 for the Winchester 1895 lever-action rifle. It remains to this day one of the most powerful rimmed cartridges designed specifically for lever-action rifles; the only modern lever action cartridges that exceed its performance are the .50 Alaskan, .450 Alaskan, .475 Turnbull, .348 Turnbull, and the .450 Marlin. The .405 was highly regarded by U.S. President Theodore Roosevelt during his safari in East Africa.

== Description and Ballistics ==
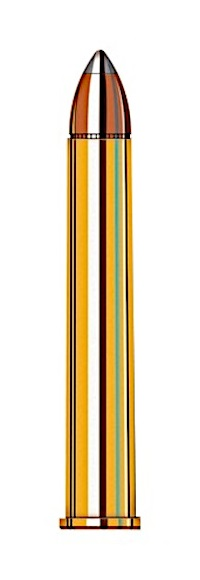
The .405 WCF.

The original Winchester factory load consisted of a 300gr. soft point or metal patch (Full Metal Jacket) bullet at 2200 feet per second. When the Winchester M1895 was discontinued in 1936, the cartridge was considered obsolete. Catalog listings of the cartridge ceased in 1955. However, during the 100-year anniversary of Theodore Roosevelt's presidential administration in 2001, Winchester reintroduced the M1895 built with modern steels, materials, and technology in .405 Winchester, and thereby revived the cartridge.

In addition to the Winchester Model 1895, the .405 Winchester was also available in the Winchester Model 1885 Single Shot Rifle, the Remington-Lee bolt-action rifle (from 1904 to 1906), and a number of British and European double rifles. The cartridge was also available in the Ruger No.1 Tropical single-shot rifle.

Winchester's advertising campaigns during the first decade of the twentieth century took full advantage of Theodore Roosevelt's frequent praise of the .405 Winchester, as well as the Winchester 1895 which chambered it. Roosevelt famously referred to this rifle as his "'medicine gun' for lions." This quote comes from Roosevelt's account of a lion hunt in the seventh chapter of his book African Game Trails (Scribner's Sons, 1910, page 167):

But as we stood, one of the porters behind called out "Simba"; and we caught a glimpse of a big lioness galloping down beside the trees, just beyond the donga...Tarlton took his big double-barrel and advised me to take mine, as the sun had just set and it was likely to be close work; but I shook my head, for the Winchester 405 is, at least for me personally, the "medicine gun" for lions.

Since the .405 Winchester's introduction, many hunters have used it on African big game, including rhino and buffalo; however it is generally considered best used against light skinned game, due to the bullet's low sectional density. The velocity of the cartridge is also low by contemporary standards, which makes shooting at long range challenging due to the allowance the shooter must make for bullet drop. As the Winchester M1895 was dropped in 1936, so was the cartridge. Loads developing 36,000 CUP might be better avoided in some of these nearly 100 year old Winchester M1895 lever guns. In those cases it may be better to remain within CIP specifications regarding pressure as "Bolt Thrust" could be a concern in some older rifles, possibly leading to parts breakage. Judicious loading with modern powders must stay below, and certainly not exceed each specific rifle model's pressure limitations.

== Wildcats ==
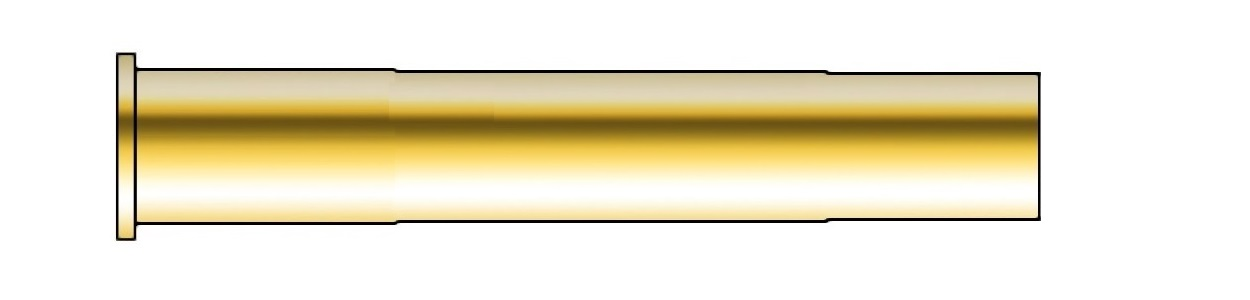
The .405 WCF case.

The .277 Elliott Express and .357 Elliott Express are two of a series of wildcats developed by O.H. Elliott & Company of South Haven, Michigan, based on the .405 Winchester cartridge. This custom gunsmith manufactured his own rifle barrels.

== Dimensions ==
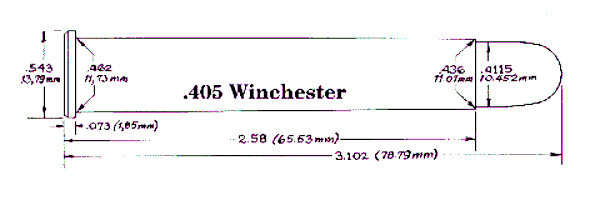

== See also ==
- List of Winchester Center Fire cartridges
- Winchester M1895
- 30-40 Krag (.30 U.S.)
- .35 Winchester
- Table of handgun and rifle cartridges
- List of rimmed cartridges
- List of cartridges by caliber
- List of rifle cartridges
- 10 mm caliber
- .40 S&W
- .400 Legend
- 10mm Auto
- .41 Action Express
- .41 Remington Magnum
