= .303/25 =

Centrefire rifle cartridge

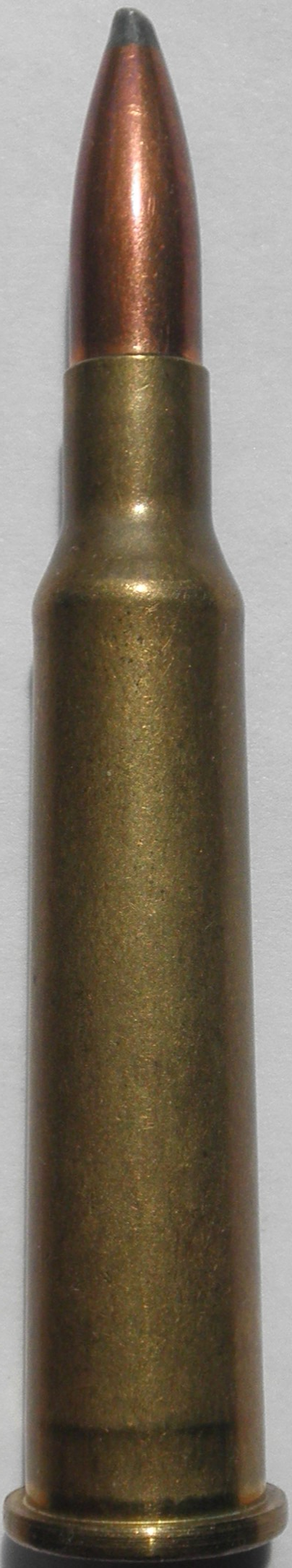
.303/.25

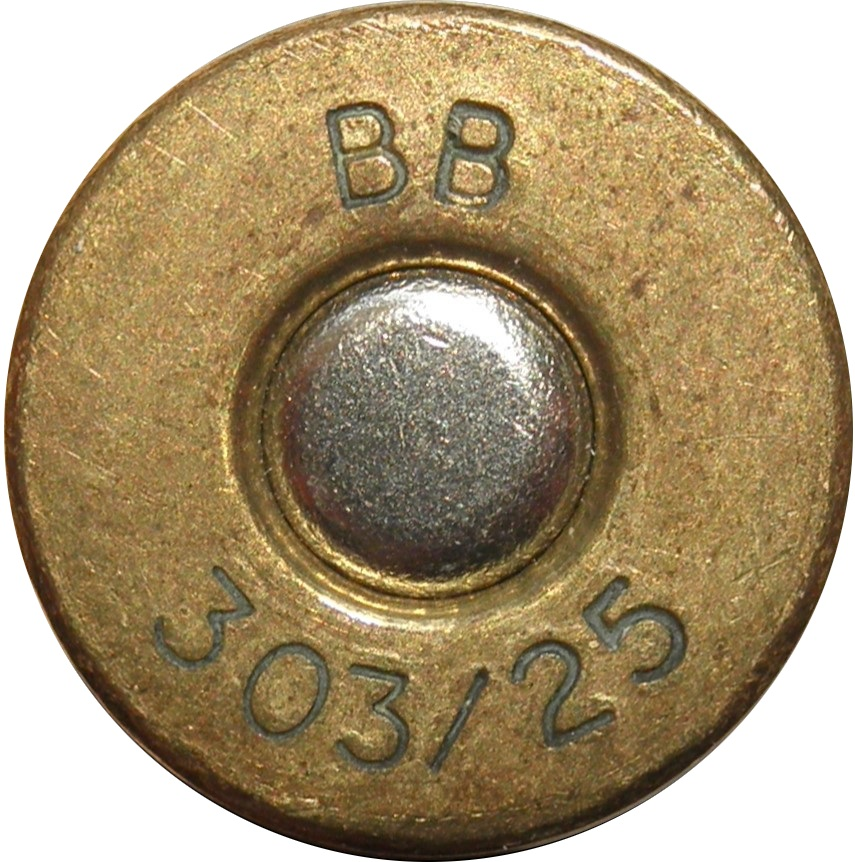
- Type: Rifle
- Place of origin: Australia

Production history
- Designed: 1940s

Specifications
- Parent case: .303 British
- Case type: Rimmed, bottleneck
- Bullet diameter: 0.257 in (6.5 mm)
- Neck diameter: 0.290 in (7.4 mm)
- Shoulder diameter: 0.412 in (10.5 mm)
- Base diameter: 0.460 in (11.7 mm)
- Rim diameter: 0.540 in (13.7 mm)
- Rim thickness: .060 in (1.5 mm)
- Case length: 2.185 in (55.5 mm)
- Overall length: 2.85 in (72 mm)
- Case capacity: 50.86 gr H_{2}O (3.296 cm^{3})
- Rifling twist: 1-12 inches
- Primer type: Large rifle

Ballistic performance
| Bullet mass/type | Velocity | Energy |
|---|---|---|
| 87 gr (6 g) SP | 3,010 ft/s (920 m/s) | 1,750 ft⋅lbf (2,370 J) |
| 100 gr (6 g) HPBT | 2,800 ft/s (850 m/s) | 1,740 ft⋅lbf (2,360 J) |
| 117 gr (8 g) SP | 2,800 ft/s (850 m/s) | 2,030 ft⋅lbf (2,750 J) |
- Test barrel length: 24

The .303/25, sometimes known as the .25/303 is a wildcat centrefire rifle cartridge, based on the .303 British, necked down to fire a .257 projectile, originating in Australia in the 1940s as a cartridge for sporterised rifles, particularly on the Lee–Enfield action; similar versions also appeared in Canada around the same time.

== History ==
In the 1940s the 303/25 filled a void for Australian hunters and farmers, because at the time there was not a wide variety of choice in firearms or calibers and civilians were prohibited from owning any military calibers. Once developed, the popularity of the cartridge increased rapidly for several reasons. The necked down wildcat version of the .303 was found to be quite accurate and suitable for small to medium/large game, and also because of the huge surplus of cheap ex-military firearms available for conversion.

Factory ammunition was available from the mid to late 1940s until the mid 1980s until the popularity of the cartridge had finally been superseded by other popular calibers.

Today the 303/25 still has a small following in Australia, but mostly it is considered an important piece of Australian firearm and hunting history.

== Overview ==
The .303/25 was very popular for a number of reasons, one being that the .25 caliber was better suited to small game than the .303, the rifles were cheap and plentiful and in New South Wales ownership of military cartridges was severely restricted. Several versions existed but most were simply necked down and slightly trimmed.

Although Lee–Enfields were the most common, conversion of other rifles mostly suited to rimmed cartridges such as P14 Enfield, Martini–Enfield, 1885 and 1895 Winchesters were often seen, as well as 98 and 96 Mausers.

In Australia the 303/25 built on a Lee–Enfield action was by far the most popular model, not only because of its easy availability from military surplus stocks, but also because of the Lee–Enfield 10-round magazine, which almost all modern centerfire rifles still have not matched.

Factory ammunition was produced by the Super Cartridge Company, Riverbrand, IMI and Sportco, some using new Boxer primed cases (single flash hole and primer has anvil), others using military Berdan primed cases (double flash hole cartridge and primer has no anvil). Factory cartridges are far easier to reload once fired in comparison to military cartridges, because military cartridges have a crimped in Berdan primer. Berden primed cartridges also have a double flash hole, making their removal difficult because the standard decapping die only has a single decapping pin.

Cases are formed by necking down standard .303 British brass with a full length 303/25 sizing die. 303 British brass is available from Remington, Federal, Winchester, Sellier & Bellot, Prvi Partisan amongst others. Reloading dies are still available from Australian company Simplex, in single, two and three die sets.

A wide variety of projectiles in .257 are available from 75gr - 120grain weight by quite a few manufacturers such as Hornady, Speer, Sierra, Nosler and Remington in hollow point, soft point, and ballistic tip, however due to the standard 1:12 twist ratio of the rifling, projectile weights are limited before accuracy and stability of the projectile are reduced. Generally most shooters of the 303/25 will not use anything over 100grains, however 87 and 90 grain projectiles seem to have the best performance on paper and in the field.

Until recently factory ammunition was no longer commercially available (Check with your preferred gun shop in Australia for availability), so all ammunition for the 303/25 was hand loaded. Load data is available from ADI's website or load data booklet, or Nick Harvey's reloading manual (9th edition for current propellants).

== Terminal Ballistics ==
The 303/25 ranks slightly ahead of the .257 Roberts for its velocities and less than .257 Weatherby Magnum. The below data is rated as a maximum load in ADI's reload data, however Nick Harveys reloading manual suggests these as starting loads to be worked up from. ADI has more than likely covered themselves from possible liability by giving conservative loads as a maximum. Less pressure = longer life for the rifle. It is a good idea to use a chronograph when developing a new load and to shoot five shot groups of each test loading to the same aim point looking for which powder amount gives the smallest group over 100m or 200m distance from a bench rest.

It is strongly recommended that loads begin at 10% less and worked up in 0.2 grain increments, stopping when signs of excessive pressure or 'hot' loads such as difficult extraction, flattened primers and cupped firing pin indentations occur. For any given rifle an accurate load may not necessarily be the quickest.

Using ADI 2206H propellant (maximum load recommended by ADI);

- 87 grain projectile with 34 grains of 2206H will produce velocities around 3050fps
- 100 grain projectile with 31 grains of 2206H will produce velocities around 2850fps

Using ADI 2208 propellant (maximum load recommended by ADI);

- 87 grain projectile with 37 grains of 2208 will produce velocities around 3050fps
- 100 grain projectile with 33.5 grains of 2208 will produce velocities around 2850fps

There are conversion charts online that will also help if you do not use ADI powders.

== See also ==
- .303/22
- .303 British
- Lee–Enfield
- List of rifle cartridges
- Sporterising
