= SIG Sauer SIGM400 =

Family of firearms manufactured by SIG Sauer

SIG Sauer SIGM400 series
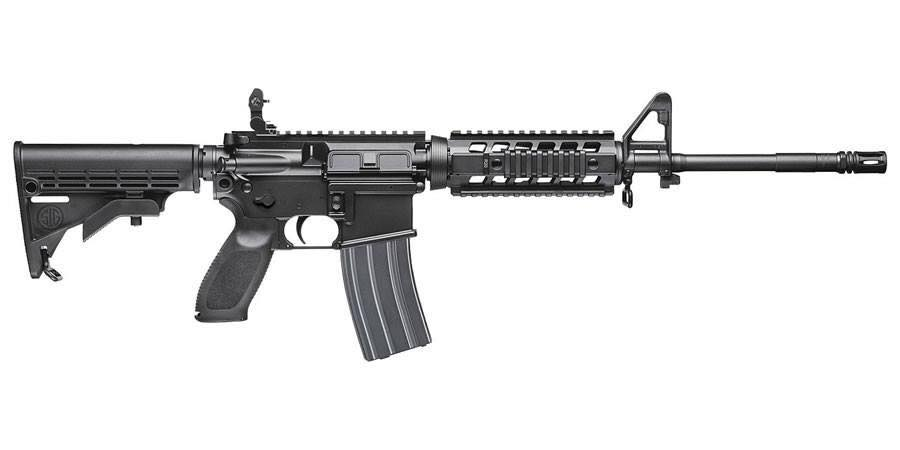
- Sig Sauer M400 series rifle
- Type: Semi-automatic rifle Carbine
- Place of origin: United States

Service history
- In service: 2011–present
- Used by: See users
- Wars: War in Iraq (2013–2017); Islamic State insurgency in Iraq (2017–present); Operation Containment

Production history
- Designed: 2000s
- Manufacturer: SIG Sauer
- Produced: 2011–present

Specifications
- Mass: 7.6 pounds (3.4 kg)
- Barrel length: 11.5–20 inches (29–51 cm) (5.56×45mm); 9–16 inches (23–41 cm) (.300 AAC)
- Cartridge: 5.56×45mm NATO.300 AAC Blackout
- Action: Direct gas impingement system, rotating bolt
- Feed system: STANAG magazines

The SIGM400 is a family of firearms manufactured by SIG Sauer. The M400 is an air-cooled, gas-operated, magazine-fed carbine based on the earlier AR-15 rifle. It is chambered for either 5.56×45mm NATO or .300 AAC Blackout cartridges, and can have a fixed or telescoping stock.

== Design details ==
=== Operating mechanism ===
The SIGM400 is a semi-automatic firearm firing from a closed bolt and uses a direct impingement gas system.

=== Features ===
The M400 is offered as either a rifle or as a pistol and is intended for law enforcement, military and civilian markets. Rifles are chambered in either 5.56×45mm NATO with 14.5-inch (37 cm), 16-inch (41 cm), 18-inch (46 cm), or 20-inch (51 cm) threaded barrels, or .300 AAC Blackout with 9-inch (23 cm) or 16-inch (41 cm) threaded barrels. There are California compliant ("featureless") models for both. The .300 AAC Blackout model is tailored specifically for efficient use with suppressors, which SIG Sauer also manufactures.

The SIGPM400 Elite PSB pistol is chambered for 5.56×45mm NATO with an 11.5-inch (29 cm) barrel and is chambered for .300 AAC Blackout with a 9-inch (23 cm) barrel. Both use a Pistol Stabilizing Brace accessory.

== Variants ==
Variants include rifles like the M400 Classic, SRP, Tread, Elite, or Predator, and the Elite PSB pistol.

=== M400 PRO ===
The M400 PRO is an improved version of the SIG M400 chambered in 5.56×45mm NATO. Changes include a cold-hammer forged barrel, 2-stage match trigger, free-floated M-LOK handguard, folding front sight, and an updated 6-position collapsible stock.

=== M400 Tread ===
The M400 TREAD is a budget-oriented variant of the M400 named for the Gadsden flag and its slogan "Dont Tread On Me". Chambered in 5.56×45mm NATO, it features a 16-inch hammer-forged barrel with a 1:8 twist and proprietary Taper-Lok muzzle threading, mid-length low-profile gas system, 15-inch free-floated handguard, and a Magpul SL-K adjustable stock. The pistol grip can hold AA, CR123A, or CR2032 batteries. Iron sights are not included.

== Users ==
- Brazil: M400 PRO used by Civil Police of Rio de Janeiro State.
- Iraq: Iraqi Special Operations Forces
- Oman: Omani Military
- Philippines: M400 PRO used by Philippine Army as a replacement for the M16A1.
- United States
  - Detroit Police Department SWAT
  - Florida Highway Patrol
  - Franklin County, Ohio Sheriff's Office
  - Philadelphia Police Department: M400 PRO.
  - Vermont State Police

== See also ==
- Heckler & Koch HK416 – German assault rifle
- SIG Sauer SIG516 – Family of rifles manufactured by SIG Sauer
- SIG MCX – Family of rifles manufactured by SIG Sauer
- M4 carbine – American assault rifle
