= .35 Winchester =

Rifle cartridge

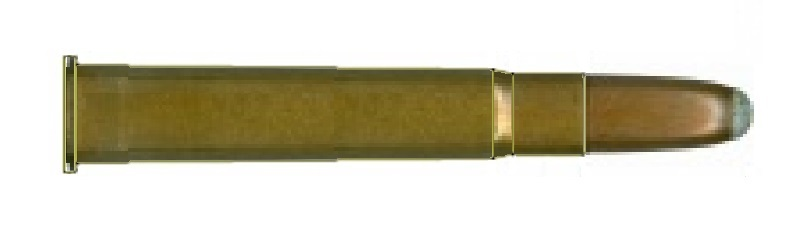
- .35 Winchester
- Type: Rifle
- Place of origin: United States

Production history
- Designed: 1903
- Manufacturer: Winchester
- Produced: 1903–1936

Specifications
- Parent case: .30 U.S.
- Case type: Rimmed, bottleneck
- Bullet diameter: .358 in (9.1 mm)
- Neck diameter: .378 in (9.6 mm)
- Shoulder diameter: .412 in (10.5 mm)
- Base diameter: .457 in (11.6 mm)
- Rim diameter: .539 in (13.7 mm)
- Case length: 2.41 in (61 mm)
- Overall length: 3.16 in (80 mm)
- Rifling twist: 1:12
- Primer type: large rifle

The .35 Winchester / 9.1x61mmR (colloquially .35 Win) cartridge was created in 1903 by the Winchester Repeating Arms Company for use in the Winchester Model 1895 lever-action rifle, and was also available in the bolt action Remington-Lee, or the Model 1905-E and 1905-R Factory Sporter Ross Rifle in Canada.

== Description and performance ==
Winchester factory loads utilized a 250 grain soft point bullet at a muzzle velocity of 2,195 feet-per-second with a resulting muzzle energy of 2,674 foot-pounds.

Because of the 1895 rifle's box magazine pointed bullets may be used which enhance the long range effectiveness of the cartridge. While obsolete, it is generally considered sufficient for all large game animals in North America. .30-40 Krag brass can be used to form .35 Winchester cases. The three original calibers for the Winchester 1895 were the 30 U.S. (.30-40 Krag), .35 Winchester, and .405 Winchester and they all share an almost identical rim and base diameter, as well as pressure ratings (see Winchester M1895).

It was intended to be a medium-sized caliber in the M1895 family falling between the .30-40 Krag and the .405 Winchester, and so it outperformed the .33 Winchester but was less potent than the .348 or .358.Enough at short or medium ranges against moose, elk, or even brown bear, it is suitable for any big game in North America, though it lacks the versatility of more modern rounds.

It was dropped in 1936, along with the 1895 rifle. Loads developing 45,000 CUP or over should be avoided in those nearly 100 year old Winchester M1895 lever guns. Judicious loading with modern powders must stay below, and certainly not exceed, that pressure limitation.

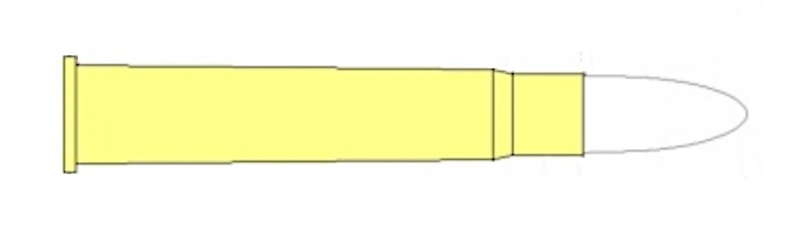
The .35 Win cartridge.

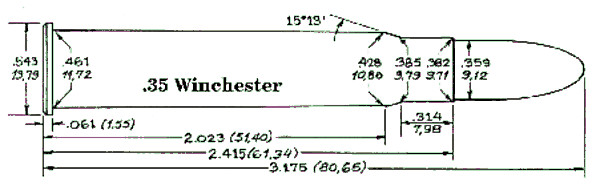

== Ballistics ==
Data from the Lyman Ideal Hand Book, 40

Bullet name & type	Bullet weight (grains)	Powder name	Powder weight (grains)	Muzzle velocity (ft/s)
Cast lead, plain base	165	IMR 4759	13	1186
Cast lead, plain base	220	IMR 4759	17.5	1395
Cast lead with gas check	249	IMR 4198	25	1500

== See also ==
- List of rifle cartridges
- List of rimmed cartridges
- 9mm caliber
- 30-40 Krag (.30 U.S.)
- .405 Winchester
