= .40-72 Winchester =

Rifle cartridge

.40-72 Winchester Center Fire
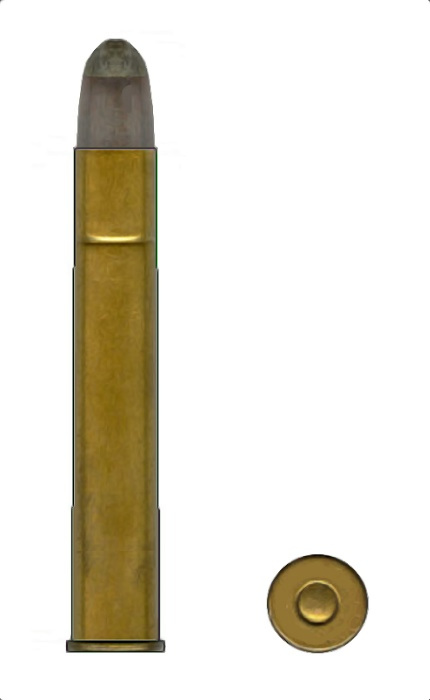
- Type: Rifle
- Place of origin: United States

Production history
- Designer: Winchester Repeating Arms Company
- Manufacturer: Winchester Repeating Arms Company
- Produced: 1895–1936

Specifications
- Case type: Rimmed, straight
- Bullet diameter: .406 in (10.3 mm)
- Neck diameter: .431 in (10.9 mm)
- Base diameter: .460 in (11.7 mm)
- Rim diameter: .518 in (13.2 mm)
- Case length: 2.60 in (66 mm)
- Overall length: 3.15 in (80 mm)
- Rifling twist: 1 in 22 inches
- Primer type: large rifle

Ballistic performance
Bullet mass/type	Velocity	Energy
330 gr (21 g)	1,380 ft/s (420 m/s)	1,395 ft⋅lbf (1,891 J)
300 gr (19 g)	1,420 ft/s (430 m/s)	1,342 ft⋅lbf (1,820 J)
- Test barrel length: 26; Source(s): The Rifle in America

The .40-72 Winchester, also known as .40-72 WCF is a centerfire straight-walled rifle cartridge designed for black powder rather than smokeless powder. It was introduced in 1895 for the Winchester 1895 lever-action rifle.

== Description and performance ==
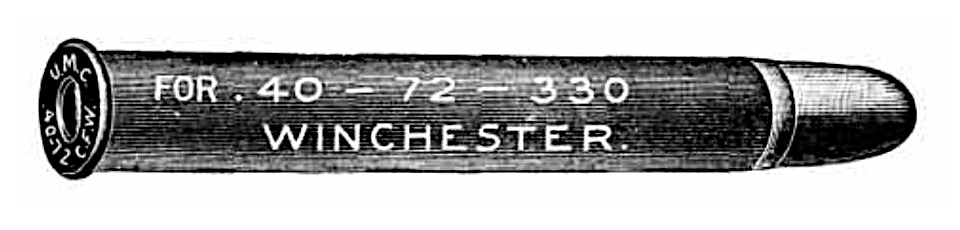
The .40-72 Winchester cartridge.

The original Winchester factory load consisted of a 300-grain (19 g) bullet at 1,420 ft/s (430 m/s) or a 330-grain (21 g) bullet at 1,380 ft/s (420 m/s).

With the introduction of superior cartridges designed for smokeless powder, the .40-72 Winchester became obsolete and was soon dropped from production. Production of loaded cartridges by Winchester ceased in 1936.

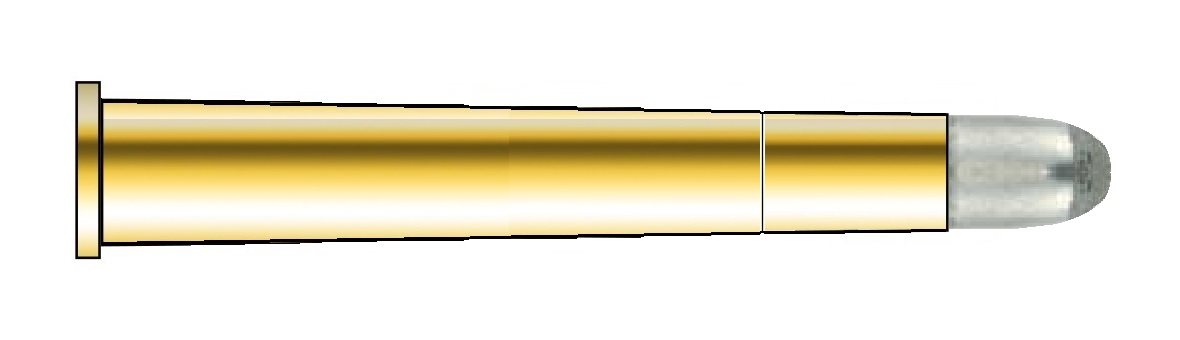
The .40-72 WCF cartridge.

Besides the Winchester 1895 lever-action, the .40-72 Winchester was chambered in the Winchester 1885 single-shot rifle.

== Dimensions ==
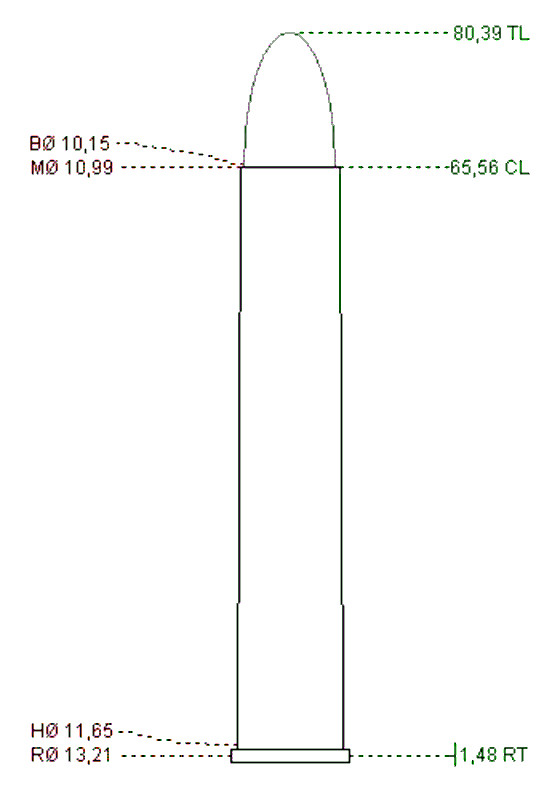

== See also ==
- List of Winchester Center Fire cartridges
- List of rimmed cartridges
- List of cartridges by caliber
- List of rifle cartridges
- .40 S&W
- 10mm Auto
- .41 Action Express
