= .38-72 Winchester =

Rifle cartridge

.38-72 Winchester center fire
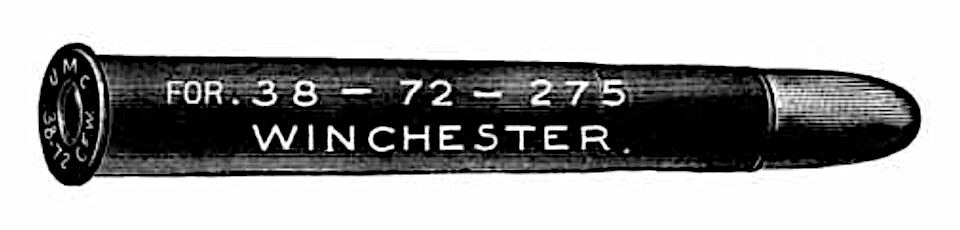
- Type: Rifle
- Place of origin: United States

Production history
- Designer: Winchester Repeating Arms Company
- Manufacturer: Winchester Repeating Arms Company
- Produced: 1895–1936

Specifications
- Case type: Rimmed, straight
- Bullet diameter: .378 in (9.6 mm)
- Neck diameter: .397 in (10.1 mm)
- Shoulder diameter: .427 in (10.8 mm)
- Base diameter: .461 in (11.7 mm)
- Rim diameter: .519 in (13.2 mm)
- Case length: 2.58 in (66 mm)
- Overall length: 3.16 in (80 mm)
- Rifling twist: 22
- Primer type: large rifle

Ballistic performance
Bullet mass/type	Velocity	Energy
275 gr (18 g)	1,480 ft/s (450 m/s)	1,337 ft⋅lbf (1,813 J)
- Test barrel length: 24; Source(s): The Rifle in America

The .38-72 Winchester, also known as .38-72 WCF is a rimmed, bottleneck centerfire rifle cartridge introduced in 1895 for the Winchester 1895 lever-action rifle.

== Description and Performance ==
The original Winchester factory load consisted of a 275-grain (17.8 g) bullet at 1,480 ft/s (450 m/s). This straight-walled cartridge case was designed for black powder rather than smokeless powder.

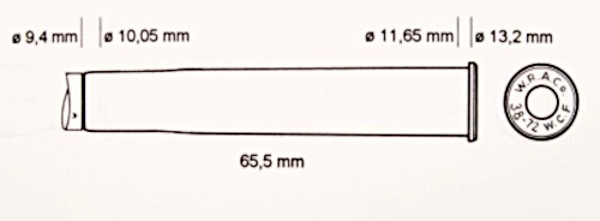
.38-72 Winchester case dimensions.

Besides the Winchester 1895 lever-action, the .38-72 WCF was chambered in the Winchester 1885 single-shot rifle.

With the introduction of superior cartridges designed for smokeless powder, the .38-72 WCF became obsolete and was soon dropped as an optional caliber for the Winchester Model 1895 and 1885 Production of loaded cartridges by Winchester ceased in 1936.

== Dimensions ==
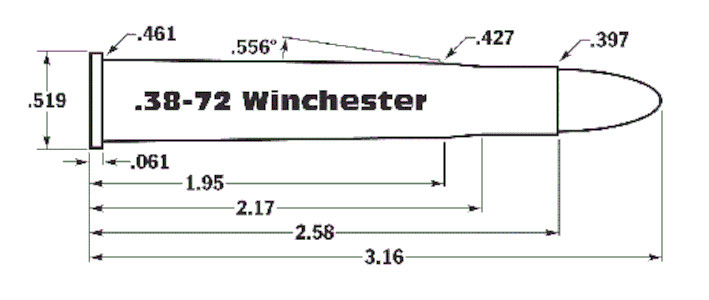

== See also ==
- List of Winchester Center Fire cartridges
- List of rimmed cartridges
- List of cartridges by caliber
- List of rifle cartridges
- 9 mm caliber
- 9.3×74mmR
- .375 Winchester
- .38-55 Winchester
