= Sporterising =

Method of firearms modification for civilian use

Sporterising, sporterisation or sporterization is the practice of modifying military-type firearms, either to make them more suitable for civilian hunting or sporting use, or to make them legal under gun law.

== Modifying for sporting use ==
Modifying for sporting use can involve the addition of a commercial, variable power telescopic sight, the shortening of the fore-end, and (in some cases) the fitting of a new stock. Sporterised rifles may be re-finished or otherwise customized to the tastes or requirements of the individual owner- for example, shortening the barrel or rechambering the firearm in a different caliber. Integrated bayonets, if present, are removed, as are muzzle devices sometimes for legal reasons.

Large numbers of military surplus rifles were sporterised in the 1950s and 1960s- especially Lee–Enfield, M1903 Springfield, and Mauser K98 rifles, which were in abundant supply after WWII, and therefore cheaper to acquire than a newly manufactured commercial hunting rifle.

SMLE Mk III rifles, in particular, were popular for sporterisation in Australia, New Zealand, and South Africa, with many being converted to wildcat calibers such as .303/25 owing to both the difficulties of importing foreign-made rifles (due largely to economic factors), and also restrictions in the state of New South Wales on the ownership of firearms "of a military caliber", interpreted to mean the .303 British cartridge then in use by the British and Commonwealth militaries. Even in states and countries where there were no such restrictions, many sporting shooters at the time found it expedient to cut down their ex-military SMLEs, in the interests of reducing weight or improving handling.

The practice of sporterising is frowned upon by most collectors and firearms enthusiasts because many military surplus rifles are highly collectible in original condition. Permanently altered sporterised firearms often sell for less money than military firearms in original condition.

A number of "Commercial" sporting conversions of military surplus arms were undertaken in the 1950s by Interarms, Golden State Arms, the Gibbs Rifle Co. and Navy Arms in the United States. These rifles are often considered to be collectible in their own right, and are not generally regarded as being "sporterised" in the usual sense of the word.

== Modifying for compliance with legislation ==
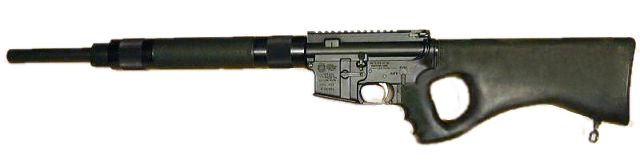
AR-15 sporterized with a thumbhole stock for the Japanese market

Semiautomatic and civilian versions of assault rifles are marketed as Sporter or S models.

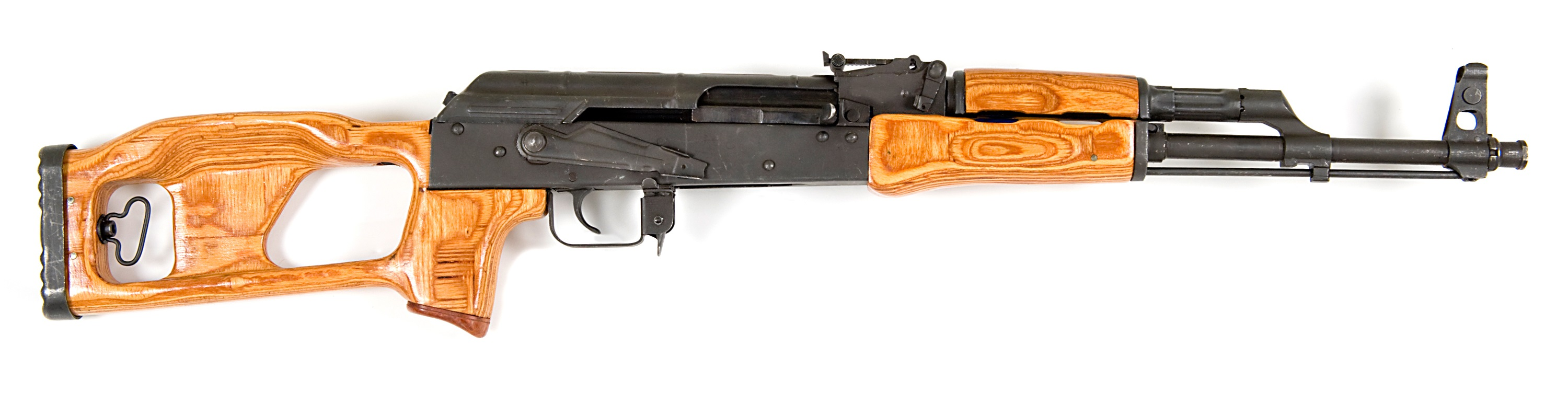
A sporterized Romanian Kalashnikov; besides the stock, the muzzle was modified to prevent bayonet mounting

The term "sporterising" is also used by some to describe the practice by gun manufacturers of producing civilian models of military-style weapons by removing legally restricted features. For example, a manufacturer might have replaced a pistol grip with a thumb-hole stock, or a flash suppressor with a muzzle brake, in order to comply with legislation such as the 1994-2004 US Federal Assault Weapons Ban. Similarly the design of a rifle may be altered in order to prevent it being fired in automatic or burst mode in order to comply with a region's statutes, with some models having entirely different receivers that prevent the fitting of military select-fire trigger groups. Many manufacturers simply settle for semi automatic-only trigger groups without undergoing extensive modification, and select-fire trigger groups are what is often considered to be the actual machine gun part and are thus heavily restricted. Some gun-control advocates consider these civilian models an attempt to circumvent the intent of the laws.

== See also ==
- Glossary of firearms terminology
- Modern sporting rifle
- Featureless rifles
