= Featureless rifles =

Modified assault weapons

Featureless rifles are rifles with modifications made to remove prohibited features from Modern Sporting Rifles. The term is most commonly used with rifles manufactured or retrofitted to comply with gun laws in California.

Guns with a bullet button, pistol grip, flash suppressor and folding stock have been considered assault weapons requiring formal registration in California since July 1, 2018. While some gun owners have opted to register their guns, others have chosen to make modifications to keep their weapons compliant with state regulations such that registration is not required. One common change for guns with a flash suppressor is to replace it with a muzzle brake, and some have converted their guns to use .22 Long Rifle cartridges, which are smaller and less expensive than the 5.56×45mm NATO / .223 Remington cartridges that AR-15 style rifles are predominantly chambered in.

Some companies sell "featureless grips" made of Kydex that can convert pistol grips so they no longer meet the statutory definition of prohibited features. With these types of modifications, high-capacity magazines can still be used. Some companies, like Cobalt Kinetics and Hi-Point Firearms, have released rifles designed to be "featureless" under California's assault weapons statute. Both the California Rifle and Pistol Association (CRPA) and the National Rifle Association of America (NRA) have released detailed information about "featureless builds".

== See also ==
- Sporterising
