= .303 British =

British military rifle cartridge

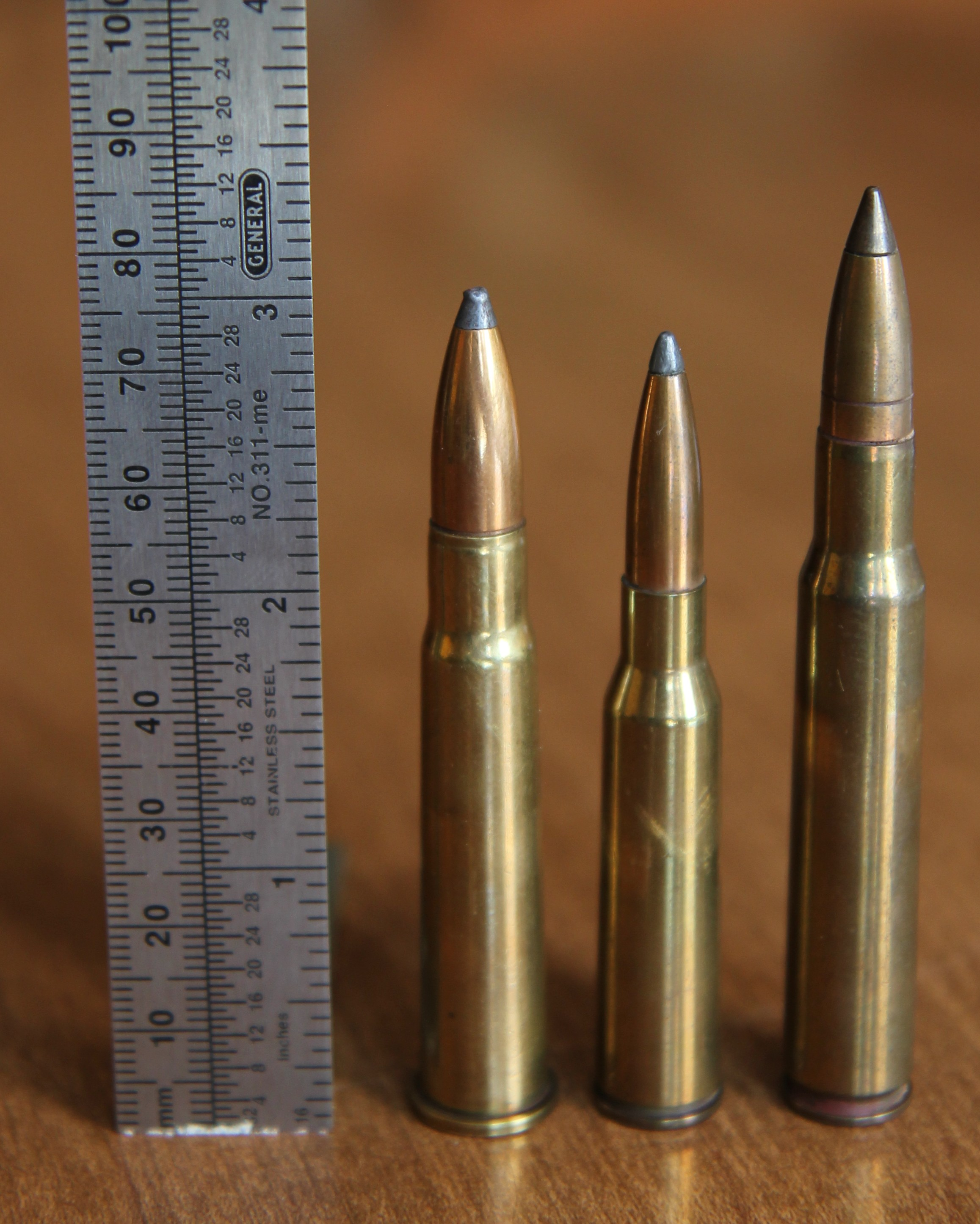
- Left to right: .303 British, 6.5×50mmSR Arisaka and .30-06 Springfield ballistic tip ammunition
- Type: Rifle
- Place of origin: United Kingdom

Service history
- In service: 1889–present
- Used by: United Kingdom and many other countries
- Wars: Second Boer War; Boxer Rebellion; World War I; Various Colonial conflicts; Irish War of Independence; Irish Civil War; World War II; Indonesian National Revolution; Indo-Pakistani Wars; Greek Civil War; Malayan Emergency; French Indochina War; Korean War; Arab–Israeli War; Suez Crisis; Mau Mau Uprising; Portuguese Colonial War; Sino-Indian War; Vietnam War; Bangladesh Liberation War; Soviet-Afghan War; Nepalese Civil War; Afghanistan conflict

Production history
- Produced: 1889–present

Specifications
- Case type: Rimmed, tapered, bottleneck
- Bullet diameter: 0.312 in (7.9 mm)
- Land diameter: 0.303 in (7.7 mm)
- Neck diameter: 0.340 in (8.6 mm)
- Shoulder diameter: 0.401 in (10.2 mm)
- Base diameter: 0.460 in (11.7 mm)
- Rim diameter: 0.540 in (13.7 mm)
- Rim thickness: 0.064 in (1.6 mm)
- Case length: 2.222 in (56.4 mm)
- Overall length: 3.075 in (78.1 mm)
- Case capacity: 56.2 gr H_{2}O (3.64 cm^{3})
- Rifling twist: 1-10 in (254 mm)
- Primer type: Large rifle
- Maximum pressure (C.I.P.): 52,939 psi
- Maximum pressure (SAAMI): 49,000 psi
- Maximum CUP: 45,000 CUP

Ballistic performance
Bullet mass/type	Velocity	Energy
150 gr (10 g) SP	844 m/s (2,770 ft/s)	3,463 J (2,554 ft⋅lbf)
174 gr (11 g) HPBT	761 m/s (2,500 ft/s)	3,265 J (2,408 ft⋅lbf)
180 gr (12 g) SP	783 m/s (2,570 ft/s)	3,574 J (2,636 ft⋅lbf)
- Test barrel length: 24 in (610 mm); Source: Accurate Powder

The .303 British (designated as the 303 British by the C.I.P. and SAAMI) or 7.7×56mmR, is a .303-inch (7.7 mm) calibre rimmed tapered bottleneck centerfire rifle cartridge. The .303-inch bore diameter is measured between rifling lands as is the common practice in Europe, which follows the traditional black powder convention.

It was first manufactured in the United Kingdom as a stop-gap black powder round put into service in December 1888 for the Lee–Metford rifle. From 1891, the cartridge used smokeless powder, which had been the intention from the outset, but the decision on which smokeless powder to adopt had been delayed. It was the standard British and Commonwealth military cartridge for rifles and machine guns from 1889 until it was replaced by the 7.62×51mm NATO in the 1950s.

== Cartridge specifications ==
The .303 British has a 3.64 mL (56 gr H_{2}O) cartridge case capacity. The pronounced tapering exterior shape of the case was designed to promote reliable case feeding and extraction in bolt-action rifles and machine guns alike, under challenging conditions.

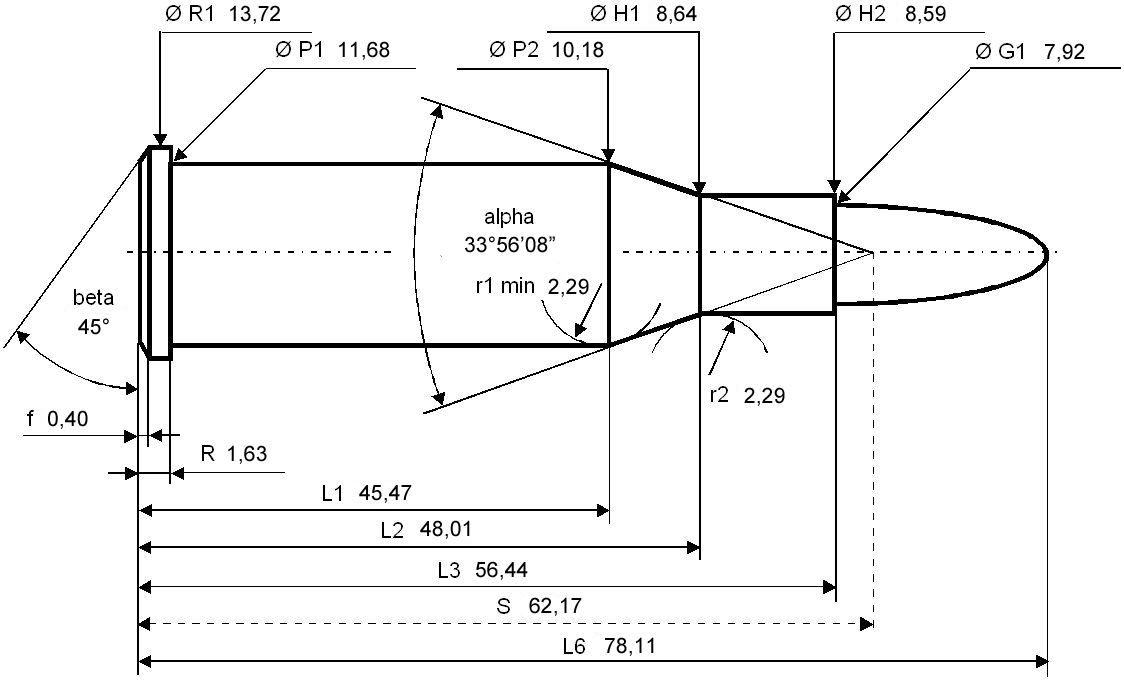
.303 British maximum C.I.P. cartridge dimensions. All sizes in millimetres (mm).

Americans would define the shoulder angle at alpha/2 ≈ 17 degrees. The common rifling twist rate for this cartridge is 254 mm (10.0 in), 5 grooves, Ø lands = 7.70 millimetres (0.303 in), Ø grooves = 7.92 millimetres (0.312 in), land width = 2.12 millimetres (0.083 in) and the primer type is Berdan or Boxer (in large rifle size).

According to official rulings of the Commission internationale permanente pour l'épreuve des armes à feu portatives (CIP), the .303 British can handle up to 3,650 bars (365.0 MPa; 52,940 psi) P_{max} piezo pressure. In CIP-regulated countries, every rifle cartridge combo has to be proofed at 125% of this maximum CIP pressure to certify for sale to consumers. This means that .303 British chambered arms in CIP-regulated countries are, as of 2023, proof tested at 4,562 bars (456.2 MPa; 66,170 psi) PE piezo pressure.

The Sporting Arms and Ammunition Manufacturers' Institute (SAAMI) maximum average pressure (MAP) for this cartridge is 49,000 psi (338 MPa) piezo pressure (45,000 CUP).

The measurement .303 inches (7.7 mm) is the nominal size of the bore measured between the lands, which follows the older black powder nomenclature. Measured between the grooves, the nominal size of the bore is .311 inches (7.9 mm). Bores for many .303 military surplus rifles are often found ranging from around .309 to .318 inches (7.8–8.1 mm). Recommended bullet diameter for standard .303 British cartridges is .312 inches (7.9 mm).

== Military use ==
=== History and development ===
During a service life of over 70 years with the British Commonwealth armed forces, the .303-inch (7.7 mm) cartridge in its ball pattern progressed through ten marks, eventually extending to about 26 variations. The bolt thrust of the .303 British is relatively low compared to many other service rounds used in the early 20th century.

=== Propellant ===
The original .303 British service cartridge employed black powder as a propellant, and was adopted for the Lee–Metford rifle, which had rifling designed to lessen fouling from this propellant, which replaced the Martini-Henry rifle in 1888. Some Martini-Henrys were rebarrelled to use the new .303 as the "Martini–Metford".

The Lee–Metford was used as a trial platform by the British Committee on Explosives to experiment with many different smokeless powders then coming to market, including Ballistite, Cordite, and Rifleite. Ballistite was a stick-type smokeless powder composed of soluble nitrocellulose and nitroglycerine. Cordite was a stick-type or 'chopped' smokeless gunpowder composed of nitroglycerine, gun-cotton, and mineral jelly, while Rifleite was a true nitrocellulose powder, composed of soluble and insoluble nitrocellulose, phenyl amidazobense, and volatiles similar to French smokeless powders. Unlike Cordite, Rifleite was a flake powder, and contained no nitroglycerine. Excessive wear of the shallow Metford rifling with all smokeless powders then available caused ordnance authorities to institute a new type of barrel rifling designed by the Royal Small Arms Factory at Enfield, to increase barrel life; the redesigned rifle introduced in 1895 as the Lee–Enfield. After extensive testing, the Committee on Explosives selected Cordite for use in the Mark II .303 British service cartridge.

=== Projectile ===
The initial .303 Mark I and Mk II service cartridges used a 215-grain (13.9 g), round-nosed, copper-nickel full metal jacketed bullet with a lead core. After tests determined that the service bullet had too thin a jacket when used with cordite, the Mk II bullet was introduced, with a flat base and a thicker copper-nickel jacket.

=== Mark II – Mark VI ===
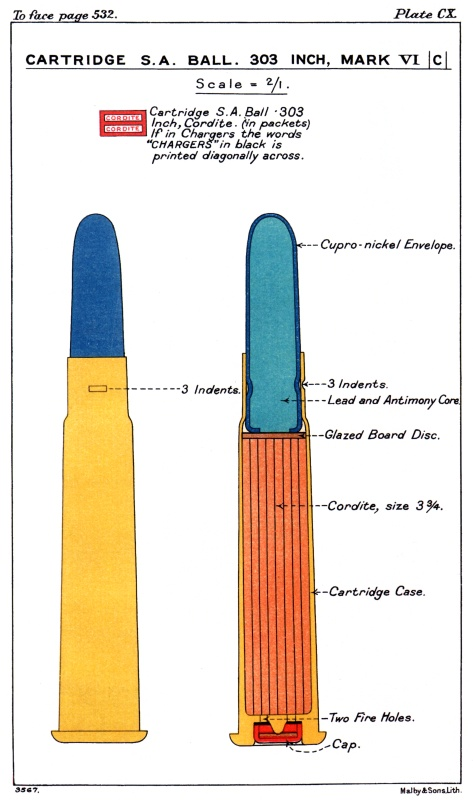
Longitudinal section of Mk VI ammunition 1904, showing the round nose bullet

The Mk II round-nosed bullet was found to be unsatisfactory when used in combat, particularly when compared to the "dum-dum" expanding bullet rounds issued in limited numbers in 1897 during the Chitral and Tirah expeditions of 1897–98 on the North West Frontier of India. This led to the 1898 introduction of the Cartridge S.A. ball .303 inch Cordite Mark III, basically the original 215-grain (13.9 g) bullet with the jacketing cut back to expose the lead in the nose. The Mk III load, however, was almost immediately withdrawn as a result of production issues leading to the introduction of the similar Mk IV hollow-point loading in February of the next year, which was put into mass production in Britain, Canada and New Zealand. Following the pivotal Battle of Omdurman of the Mahdist War, Major Mathias of the Royal Army Medical Corps observed a young man who had been struck twice by Mark IV bullets:

He had a bullet wound of the left leg above the knee. The wound entrance was clean cut and very small. The projectile had struck the Femur, just above the internal condyle; the whole of the lower end of this bone, and upper end of the Tibia, were shattered to pieces, the knee joint being completely disorganised.

He had also been wounded in the right shoulder... The whole of the shoulder joint and scapular [sic] were shattered to pieces. In neither case was there any sign of a wound of exit.

The design of the Mk IV hollow-point bullet shifted bullet weight rearwards, improving stability and accuracy over the regular round-nose bullet. These soft-nosed and hollow-point bullets, while effective against human targets, had a tendency to shed the outer metal jacket upon firing; the latter occasionally stuck in the bore, causing a dangerous obstruction. This was addressed by the introduction of a revised Mk V loading later in October (controversially so, as by August the Hague Convention had already made the military implementation of such expanding bullets illegal) identical to the Mark IV round apart from the addition of 2% antimony to the lead core and an additional 1.3 mm in length.

The concern about expanding bullets was brought up at the Hague Convention of 1899 by Swiss and Dutch representatives. The Swiss were concerned about small arms ammunition that "increased suffering", and the Dutch focused on the British Mark III .303 loading in response to their treatment of Boer settlers in South Africa. The British and American defence was that they should not focus on specific bullet designs, like hollow-points, but instead on rounds that caused "superfluous injury". The parties in the end agreed to abstain from using expanding bullets. With the use of expanding bullets against signatories of the convention deemed inhumane, the Mk III, Mk IV, and Mk V were withdrawn from active service. The remaining stocks (over 45 million rounds) were used for target practice. The Mark III and other expanding versions of the .303 were not issued during the Second Boer War (1899–1902). Boer guerrillas allegedly used expanding hunting ammunition against the British during the war, and New Zealand Commonwealth troops may have brought Mark III rounds with them privately after the Hague Convention without authorization.

To replace the Mk III, IV, and V, the Mark VI round was introduced in 1904, using a round nose bullet similar to the Mk II, but with a thinner jacket designed to produce some expansion, though this proved not to be the case.

=== Mark VII ===
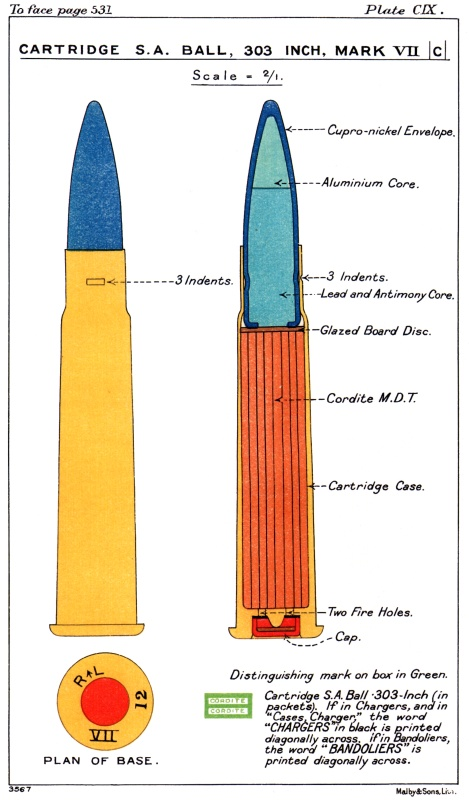
Longitudinal section of Mk VII ammunition circa 1915, showing the "tail heavy" design

In 1898, Atelier de Construction de Puteaux (APX), with their "Balle D" design for the 8×50mmR Lebel cartridge, revolutionised bullet design with the introduction of pointed "spitzer" rounds. In addition to being pointed, the bullet was also much lighter in order to deliver a higher muzzle velocity. It was found that as velocity increased the bullets suddenly became much more deadly.

In 1910, the British took the opportunity to replace their Mk VI cartridge with a more modern design. The Mark VII loading used a 174 gr (11.28 g) pointed bullet with a flat-base. The .303 British Mark VII cartridge was loaded with 37 gr (2.40 g) of Cordite MDT 5-2 (cordite MD pressed into tubes) and had a muzzle velocity of 2,440 ft/s (744 m/s) and a maximum range of approximately 3,000 yd (2,700 m). The Mk VII was different from earlier .303 bullet designs or spitzer projectiles in general. Although it appears to be a conventional spitzer-shape full metal jacket bullet, this appearance is deceptive: its designers made the front third of the interior of the Mk 7 bullets out of aluminium (from Canada) or tenite (cellulosic plastic), wood pulp or compressed paper, instead of lead and they were autoclaved to prevent wound infection. This lighter nose shifted the centre of gravity of the bullet towards the rear, making it tail heavy. Although the bullet was stable in flight due to the gyroscopic forces imposed on it by the rifling of the barrel, it behaved very differently upon hitting the target. As soon as the bullet hit the target and decelerated, its heavier lead base caused it to pitch violently and deform. By tumbling, it inflicted more severe gunshot wounds than a standard single-core spitzer design. The Mk VII bullet was considered to be in compliance of the Hague Convention as its metal jacket completely covered the cores. The convention only prohibited "the use of bullets which can easily expand or change their form inside the human body such as bullets with a hard covering which does not completely cover the core...". It was noted by German Professor K. Stargardt in December 1914 that the Mk VII bullet would routinely "...disintegrate on the lightest contact with a firm body, such as a bone," resulting in an "explosive effect," and leaving artillery-like fragmentation in the body. (Note: This performance is very similar to many more modern military bullet designs, such as the 5.56mm M193 bullet, the 5.56mm M855 bullet, the 5.56mm M855A1 bullet, the 7.62mm DM111 bullet, and the 7.62mm M80A1 bullet, which are designed to break apart at the crimp cannelure and fragment. The M855A1 and M80A1 bullet designs have a dual core construction.)

The Mk VIIz (and later Mk VIIIz) rounds have versions utilizing 41 gr (2.66 g) Dupont No. 16 single-base smokeless powder based on nitrocellulose flake shaped propellants. The nitrocellulose versions—first introduced in World War I—were designated with a "z" postfix indicated after the type (e.g. Mark VIIz, with a bullet weight of 175 gr (11.34 g)) and in headstamps.

==== .276 Enfield ====
.303 British cartridges, along with the Lee–Enfield rifle, were heavily criticized after the Second Boer War. Their heavy round-nosed bullets had low muzzle velocities and suffered compared to the 7×57mm rounds fired from the Mauser Model 1895. The high-velocity 7×57mm had a flatter trajectory and longer range that excelled on the open country of the South African plains. In 1910, work began on a long-range replacement cartridge, which emerged in 1912 as the .276 Enfield. The British also sought to replace the Lee–Enfield rifle with the Pattern 1913 Enfield rifle, based on the Mauser M98 bolt action design. Although the round had better ballistics, troop trials in 1913 revealed problems including excessive recoil, muzzle flash, barrel wear and overheating. Attempts were made to find a cooler-burning propellant, but further trials were halted in 1914 by the onset of World War I. As a result, the Lee–Enfield rifle was retained, and the .303 British cartridge (with the improved Mark VII loading) was kept in service.

=== Mark VIIIz ===
In 1938 the Mark VIIIz "streamline ammunition" round was approved to obtain greater range from the Vickers machine gun. The streamlined bullet was based on the 7.5×55mm Swiss GP11 projectiles and slightly longer and heavier than the Mk VII bullet at 175 gr (11.34 g), the primary difference was the addition of a boat tail at the end of the bullet and using 37 to 41 gr (2.40 to 2.66 g) of nitrocellulose smokeless powder as propellant in the case of the Mk VIIIz, giving a muzzle velocity of 2,525 ft/s (770 m/s). As a result, the chamber pressure was higher, at 40,000 to 42,000 psi (275.8 to 289.6 MPa), depending upon loading, compared to the 39,000 psi (268.9 MPa) of the Mark VII(z) round. The Mark VIIIz streamline ammunition had a maximum range of approximately 4,500 yd (4,115 m). Mk VIIIz ammunition was described as being for "All suitably-sighted .303-inch small arms and machine guns" – rifles and Bren guns were proofed at 50,000 psi (344.7 MPa) – but caused significant bore erosion in weapons formerly using Mk VII ammunition, ascribed to the channelling effect of the boat-tail projectile. As a result, it was prohibited from general use with rifles and light machine guns except when low flash was important and in emergencies. As a consequence of the official prohibition, ordnance personnel reported that every man who could get his hands on Mk VIIIz ammunition promptly used it in his own rifle.

=== Tracer, armour-piercing and incendiary ===
Tracer and armour-piercing cartridges were introduced during 1915, with explosive Pomeroy bullets introduced as the Mark VII.Y in 1916.

Several incendiaries were privately developed from 1914 to counter the Zeppelin threat but none were approved until the Brock design late in 1916 as BIK Mark VII.K Wing Commander Frank Brock RNVR, its inventor, was a member of the Brock fireworks-making family. Anti-zeppelin missions typically used machine guns loaded with a mixture of Brock bullets containing potassium chlorate, Pomeroy bullets containing dynamite, and Buckingham bullets containing pyrophoric yellow phosphorus. A later incendiary was known as the de Wilde, which had the advantage of leaving no visible trail when fired. The de Wilde was later used in some numbers in fighter guns during the 1940 Battle of Britain.

These rounds were extensively developed over the years and saw several Mark numbers. The last tracer round introduced into British service was the G Mark 8 in 1945, the last armour-piercing round was the W Mark 1Z in 1945 and the last incendiary round was the B Mark 7 in 1942. Explosive bullets were not produced in the UK after 1933 due to the relatively small amount of explosive that could be contained in the bullet, limiting their effectiveness, their role being taken by the use of Mark 6 and 7 incendiary bullets.

In 1935, the .303 O Mark 1 Observing round was introduced for use in machine guns. The bullet to this round was designed to break up with a puff of smoke on impact. The later Mark 6 and 7 incendiary rounds could also be used in this role.

During World War I British factories alone produced 7,000,000,000 rounds of .303 ammunition. Factories in other countries added greatly to this total.

=== Pencils ===
Spent .303 cartridges were used to make cases of the bullet pencils included in some of the Princess Mary Christmas gift boxes given to troops in World War 1.

== Headstamps and colour-coding ==
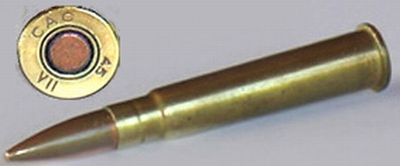
.303 British Cartridge (Mk VII), manufactured by CAC in 1945

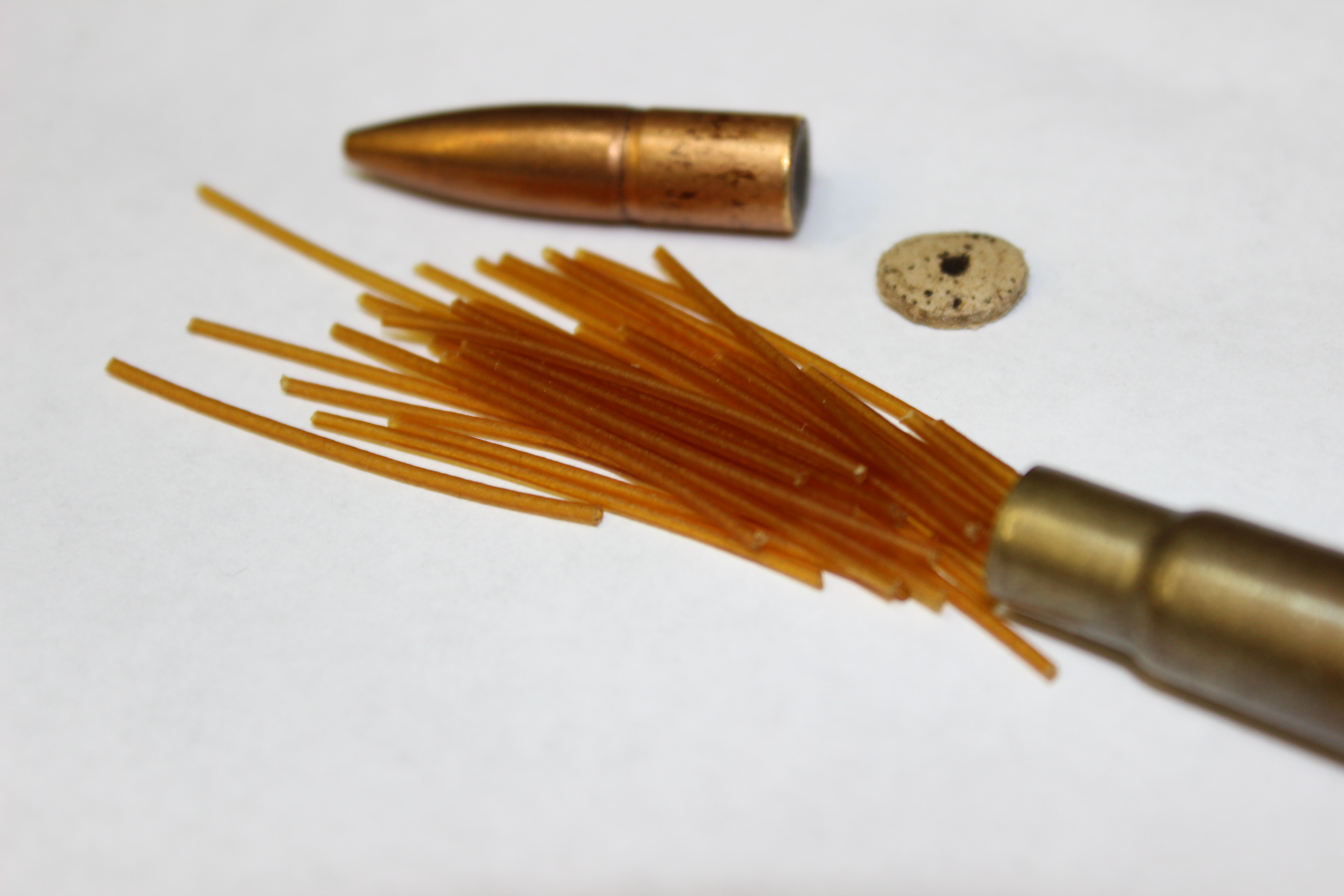
Close-up of cordite filaments in a .303 British cartridge (manufactured in 1964)

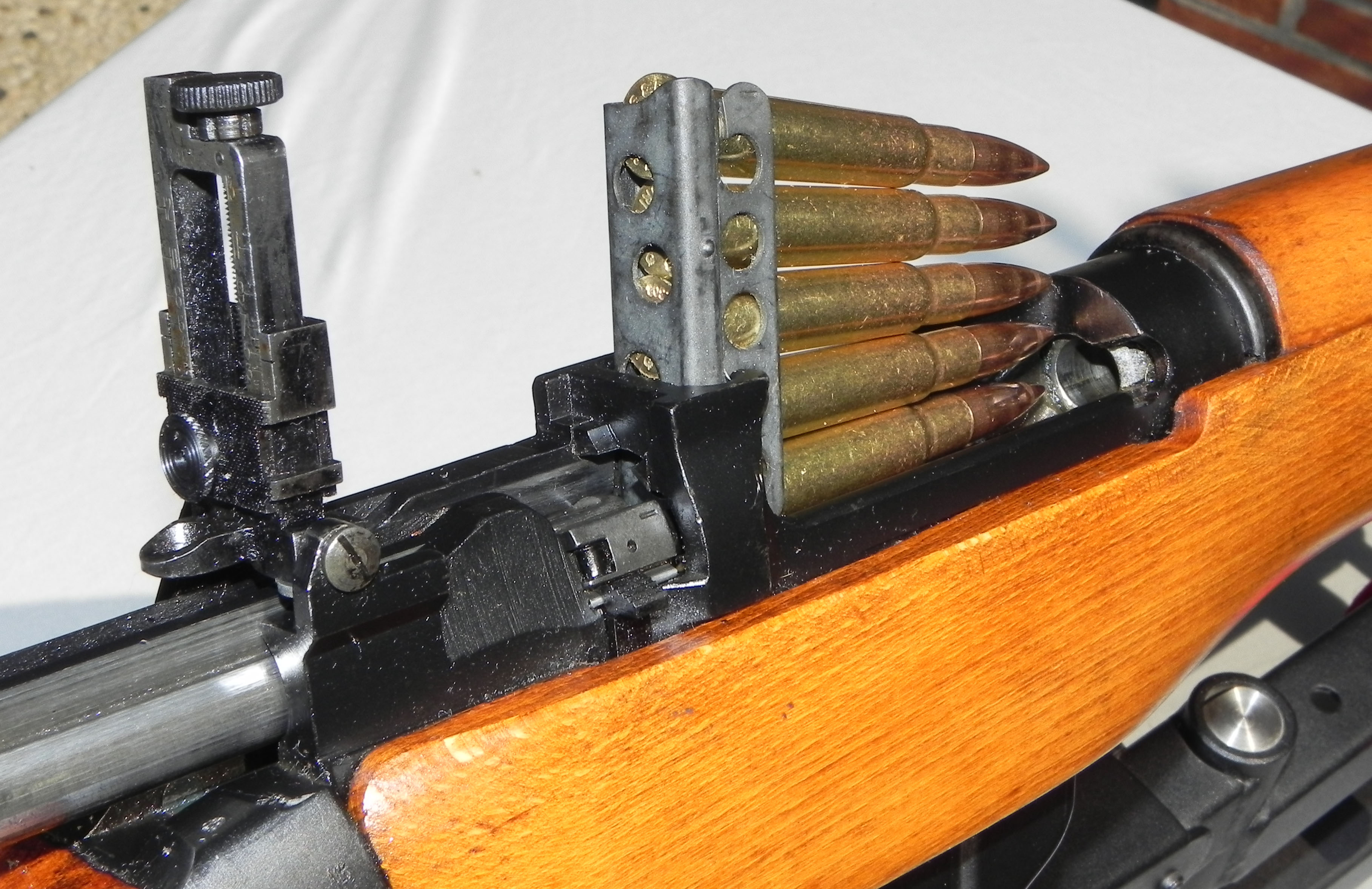
Five-round charger ready to be loaded in a Lee–Enfield No. 4 Mk 2 rifle

Headstamp ID	Primer annulus colour	Bullet tip colour	Other features	Functional type
VII or VIIZ	Purple	None	None	Ball
VIIIZ	Purple	None	None	Ball
G1, G2, G3, G7 or G8	Red	None	None	Tracer
G4, G4Z, G6 or G6Z	Red	White	None	Tracer
G5 or G5Z	Red	Grey	None	Tracer
PG1 or PG1Z	Red	None	Blue band on case base	Practice Tracer
W1 or W1Z	Green	None	None	Armour-piercing
VIIF or VIIFZ	None	None	None	Semi-armour piercing (1916–1918)
F1	Green	None	None	Semi-armour piercing (1941)
B4 or B4Z	Blue	None	Step-in bullet jacket	Incendiary
B6 or B6Z	Blue	None	None	Incendiary
B7 or B7Z	Blue	Blue	None	Incendiary
O.1	Black	Black	None	Observing
L V	None	None	crimped tip, strawboard wad in case neck	Blank Mark 5
H1Z	None	None	Front half of case blackened	Grenade discharger (No.23 grenade)
H2	None	None	Entire case blackened	Grenade discharger (rodded grenades)
H4	None	None	rosette-crimped tip with red sealant, Case blackened 3/4 in (19 mm) from each end	Grenade discharger (No.85 grenade from Lee-Enfield No.5 rifle )
H7Z	None	None	rosette-crimped tip, Rear half of case blackened	Grenade discharger. Very powerful load.
D VI	None	None	white-metal alloy case with three red-enameled longitudinal grooves, Ball bullet over wooden dowel	Drill cartridge Mark 6 (training "dummy", used by recruits when practicing loading and unloading the Lee-Enfield rifle)
U V	None	None	white-metal case, solid gilding-metal bullet over wooden dowel. Weighs the same as a Ball Mk.VII cartridge	Dummy cartridge Mark 5 (a tool cartridge, used by armorers for weapon testing and operation)

== Japanese 7.7 mm ammunition ==
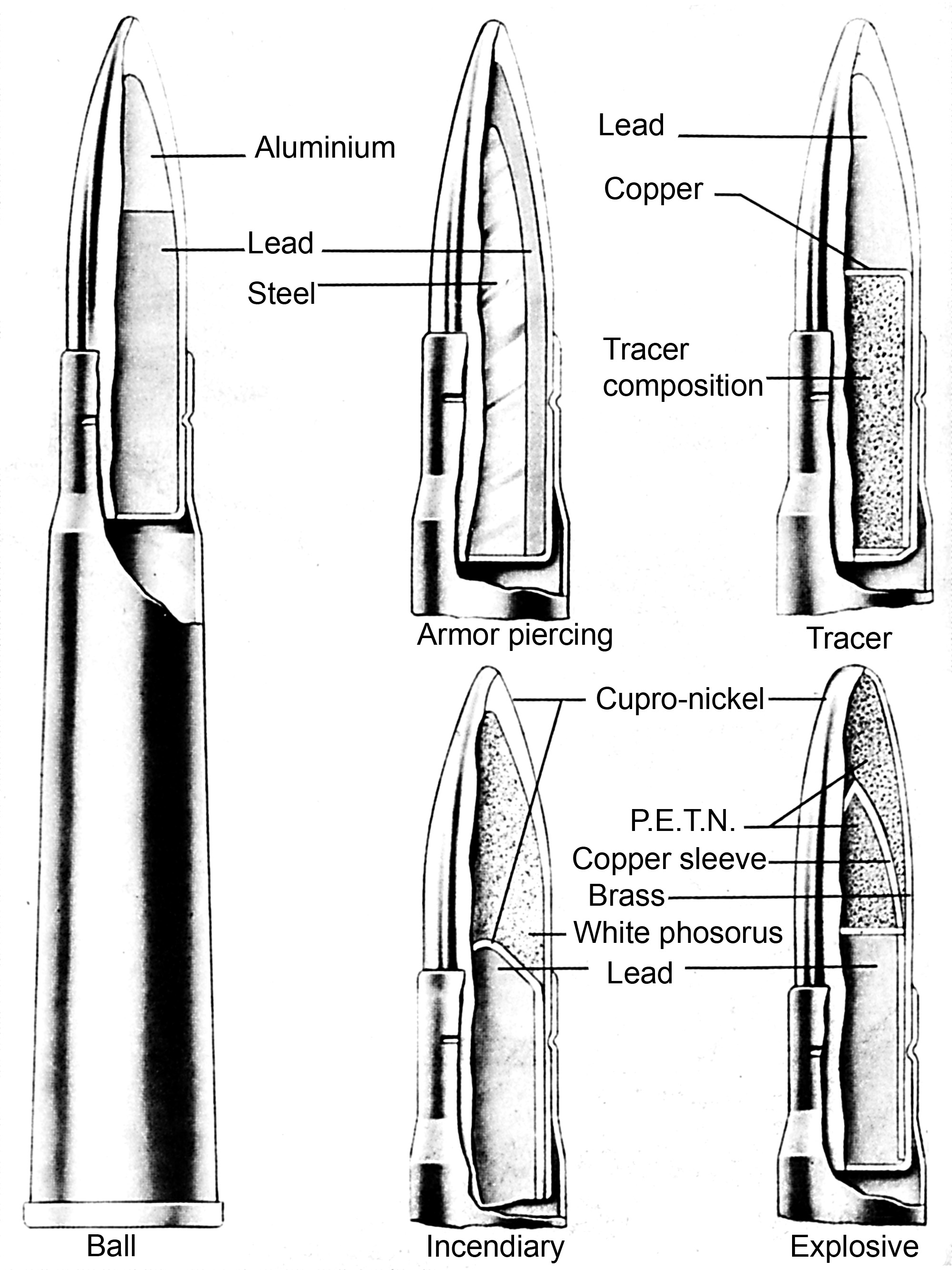
Cutaways of the five types of ammunition produced in Japan.

In 1918, the Imperial Japanese Navy Air Service adopted the Ro-Go Ko-gata seaplane, armed with a machine gun chambered in .303 British, and the calibre was also common on surplus Entente aircraft acquired by the Imperial Japanese Army Air Service after WWI. So its usage continued on IJN aircraft up to and during the Pacific War.

The Japanese military also produced a number of machine guns that were direct copies of the British Lewis (Japanese Type 92 machine gun) and Vickers machine guns, as well as ammunition for them. The 7.7 mm cartridge used by the Japanese versions of the British guns is a direct copy of the .303 British (7.7×56mmR) rimmed cartridge and is distinctly different from the 7.7×58mm Arisaka rimless and 7.7×58mm Type 92 semi-rimmed cartridges used in other Japanese machine guns and rifles.

- Ball: 174 grains (11.3 g). Cupro-nickel jacket with a composite aluminium/lead core. Black primer.
- Armour-piercing.: Brass jacket with a steel core. White primer.
- Tracer: 130 grains (8.4 g). Cupro-nickel jacket with a lead core. Red primer.
- Incendiary: 133 grains (8.6 g). Brass jacket with white phosphorus and lead core. Green primer.
- H.E.: Copper jacket with a PETN and lead core. Purple primer.

Note: standard Japanese ball ammunition was very similar to the British Mk 7 cartridge. The two had identical bullet weights and a "tail-heavy" design, as can be seen in the cut-away diagram.

== Civilian use ==
The .303 cartridge has seen much sporting use with surplus military rifles, especially in Australia, Canada, New Zealand, and to a lesser extent in the United States and South Africa. In Canada, it was found to be adequate for any game. In Australia, it was common for military rifles to be re-barrelled in .303/25 and .303/22. However the .303 round still retains a considerable following as a game cartridge for all game species, especially Sambar deer in wooded country. A change.org petition asking Lithgow Arms to chamber the LA102 centrefire rifle in .303 as a special edition release has attracted considerable attention both in Australia and worldwide. In South Africa, .303 Lee–Enfield rifles captured by the Boers during the Boer War were adapted for sporting purposes and became popular with many hunters of non-dangerous game, being regarded as adequate for anything from the relatively small impala to the massive eland and kudu.

=== Commercial ammunition ===
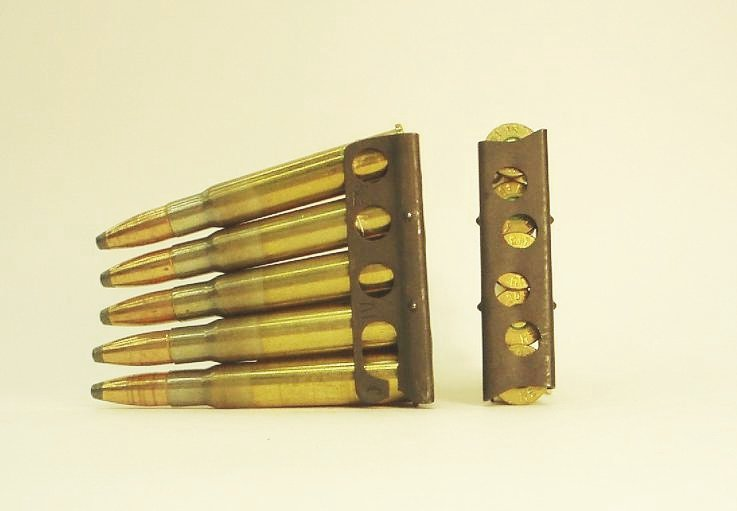
Commercial soft point .303 British loaded in a Lee–Enfield five-round charger.

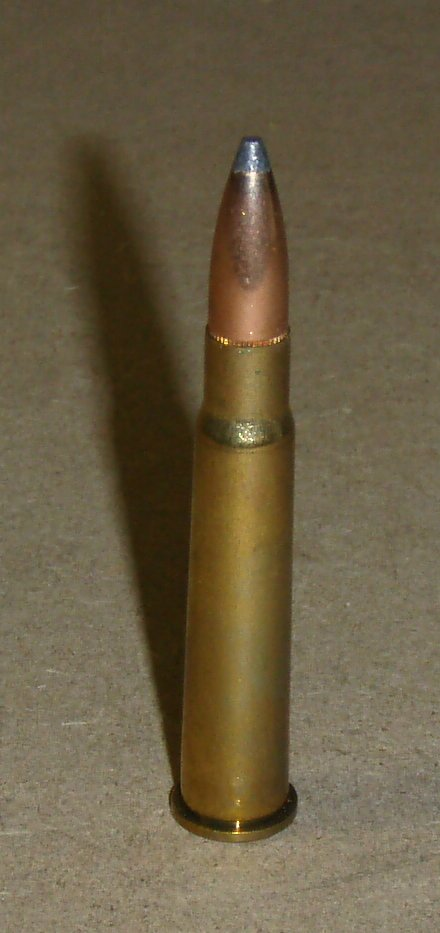
Civilian soft point .303 ammunition, suitable for hunting purposes.

The .303 British is one of the few (along with the .22 Hornet, .30-30 Winchester, and 7.62×54mmR) bottlenecked rimmed centrefire rifle cartridges still in common use today. Most of the bottleneck rimmed cartridges of the late 1880s and 1890s fell into disuse by the end of the First World War. Commercial ammunition for weapons chambered in .303 British is readily available, as the cartridge is still manufactured by major producers such as Remington, Federal, Winchester, Sellier & Bellot, Denel-PMP, Prvi Partizan and Wolf. Commercially produced ammunition is widely available in various full metal jacket bullet, soft point, hollow point, flat-based and boat tail designs, both spitzer and round-nosed.

=== Hunting use ===
The .303 British cartridge is suitable for all medium-sized game and is an excellent choice for whitetail deer and black bear hunting. In Canada it was a popular moose and deer cartridge when military surplus rifles were available and cheap; it is still used. The .303 British can offer very good penetrating ability due to a fast twist rate that enables it to fire long, heavy bullets with a high sectional density. Canadian Rangers use it for survival and polar bear protection. In 2015, the Canadian Rangers began the process to evaluate rifles chambered for .308 Winchester. The Canadian Department of National Defence has since replaced the previously issued Lee–Enfield No. 4 rifles with the Colt Canada C19 chambered as evaluated in 7.62×51mm NATO/.308 Winchester.

== Rounds developed from .303 ==
=== Pre-WWI sporting rounds ===
During the 1890s, Scottish gunsmith Daniel Fraser developed a rimless version of the cartridge known as ".303 Fraser Velox" or ".303 Fraser Rimless", loaded with a bullet of his own oblique ratchet design to enhance expansion which was patented in 1897 The bullet was also used in a proprietary loading of .303 British marketed as ".303 Fraser Flanged".

Proprietary loadings of .303 British include the ".303 Marksman" by Eley Brothers from before 1908. and ".303 Swift" from before 1911.

In 1899, the British service round was lengthened and necked-out to create the .375 Flanged Nitro Express hunting cartridge for single-shot and double rifles. Around 1905, it was necked back down to create .375/303 Westley Richards Accelerated Express.

=== Post-1917 military experiments ===
In 1917, design work started on a more powerful military cartridge of the same calibre and overall length. In 1918 it was planned that the new round, also retaining the old rim diameter, would be used in rechambered P14 rifles with AP rounds to defeat German targets on the battlefield of WWI as well as in the RAF in modified Lewis gun. The cartridge was "produced in quantity" but not adopted formally. The case was 62mm long with the bullet (a Ball Mark VII or Mark VIIW) set deep within to keep overall length down. The ordinary round was designated "Cartridge S.A. ball .303 inch Rimless" despite the fact that it retained headspacing on its rim and was semi-rimmed. It is better known today under names like ".303 Lewis Semi-Rimmed".

=== Post-1945 Australian wildcats ===
After WWII, Australians found themselves with quite a few .303" service rifles but at the same time new legal restrictions on military ammunition, which led to development of many wildcat rounds, the best-known of which are .303/25 and .303/22.

=== Post-1945 South African developments ===
In parallel to Australia, the same wildcatting was happening in other countries of the Commonwealth, and in 1969 Pretoria Metal Pressings started factory production of a .303 necked down to 6 mm (.243") under the name of 6 mm Musgrave.

=== .303 Epps ===
Canadian Ellwood Epps, founder of Epps Sporting Goods, created an improved version of the .303 British. It has better ballistic performance than the standard .303 British cartridge. This is accomplished by increasing the shoulder angle from 16 to 35 degrees, and reducing the case taper from .062 inches (1.6 mm) to .009 inches (0.23 mm). These changes increase the case's internal volume by approximately 9%. The increased shoulder angle and reduced case taper eliminate the drooping shoulders of the original .303 British case, which, combined with reaming the chamber to .303 Epps, improves case life.

== Firearms chambered in .303 British ==
=== Single-shot rifles ===
- 1885 Courteney Stalking Rifle
- Farquharson rifle
- Martini–Enfield rifle
- Ruger No. 1

=== Repeating rifles ===
- Ross rifle
- Jungle carbine
- Lee–Enfield
- Lee–Metford
- Pattern 14 Rifle
- Parker Hale Sporter Rifle
- Thorneycroft carbine
- Winchester Model 1895

=== Self-loading rifles ===
- BSA Autorifle
- Charlton Automatic Rifle
- Globco Mohawk 555
- Howell automatic rifle
- Farquar-hill rifle
- Huot automatic rifle

=== Machine guns ===
- Bren light machine gun
- Browning .303 Mark II
- Caldwell machine gun
- Darne machine gun
- Hotchkiss .303 Mk I & I*
- Lewis gun
- Madsen machine gun
- McCrudden light machine rifle
- Vickers-Berthier
- Vickers machine gun
- Browning 1895/14
- Vickers K machine gun

== See also ==
- 7 mm caliber (overview of cartridges)
- 7.65×53mm Mauser
- 8×59mm Rb Breda
- British military rifles
- List of rifle cartridges
- List of rimmed cartridges
- Table of handgun and rifle cartridges
- .303 Magnum
- .303 Savage
