= Winchester Model 1895 =

Model 1895
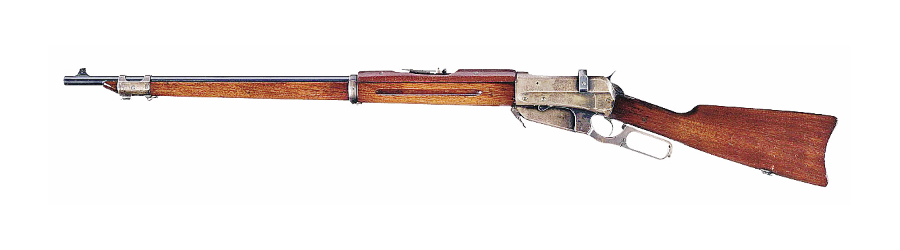
- Winchester Model 1895
- Type: Lever-action rifle
- Place of origin: United States

Service history
- In service: 1895–1945
- Used by: See Users
- Wars: Spanish–American War; Philippine–American War; Russo-Japanese War; 1907 Honduran Conflict; Mexican Revolution; Mexican Border War; World War I Finnish Civil War; Russian Civil War; Polish–Soviet War; Spanish Civil War; World War II

Production history
- Designer: John Browning
- Designed: 1895
- Manufacturer: Winchester Repeating Arms Company; Browning Arms Company
- Produced: 1895–1932 (Original; Special Order 1936–40); 1984 (Browning; Limited Edition); 1995–present (Winchester; Limited Editions)
- No. built: About 425,000
- Variants: Rifle, Carbine

Specifications
- Mass: 4.2 kg (9.3 lb)
- Length: 1,175 mm (46.3 in)
- Barrel length: 710 mm (28 in)
- Cartridge: .30-40 Krag; 7.62×54mmR; 7.92×57mm.303 British.30-03.30-06 Springfield.35 WCF.38-72 WCF.40-72 WCF.405 Winchester
- Action: Lever-action
- Feed system: 4, 5-round internal magazine, can be fed with stripper clips
- Sights: Rear: Sliding Ramp; Front: Fixed-Post

The Winchester Model 1895 is an American lever-action repeating firearm developed and manufactured by the Winchester Repeating Arms Company in the late 19th century, chambered for a number of full-size military and hunting cartridges such as 7.62×54mmR, .303 British, .30-03, .30 Army, .30-06, .35 Winchester, .38-72 Winchester, .40-72 Winchester and .405 Winchester.

== Design ==
The first Model 1895 was the first Winchester rifle to feature a box magazine that is located underneath the action instead of the tubular magazine design, which had remained fundamentally unchanged from the Winchester 1866. This allowed the rifle to safely chamber military and hunting cartridges with spitzer (pointed) bullets. The M1895 was also the last of the lever-action rifles to be designed by John Browning, and featured a rear locking bolt as in his previous designs dating back to the Winchester 1886. The M1895 is the strongest lever-action rifle Winchester produced, designed to handle the increased pressures generated by the more powerful smokeless powder cartridges entering common use at the time of its introduction. By today's standards however, the design is considered relatively weak, and not suited to high pressure loads.

Around serial number 5000, a new receiver profile was introduced which had fluted (scalloped) sides, as opposed to the original flat sided design. This new receiver reduced the weight of the rifle by a small amount, and increased the width by 1/16 of an inch. By serial number 6000, it is thought that the last of the flat sided M1895s left the factory. These early rifles are now exceedingly rare.

== Military ==
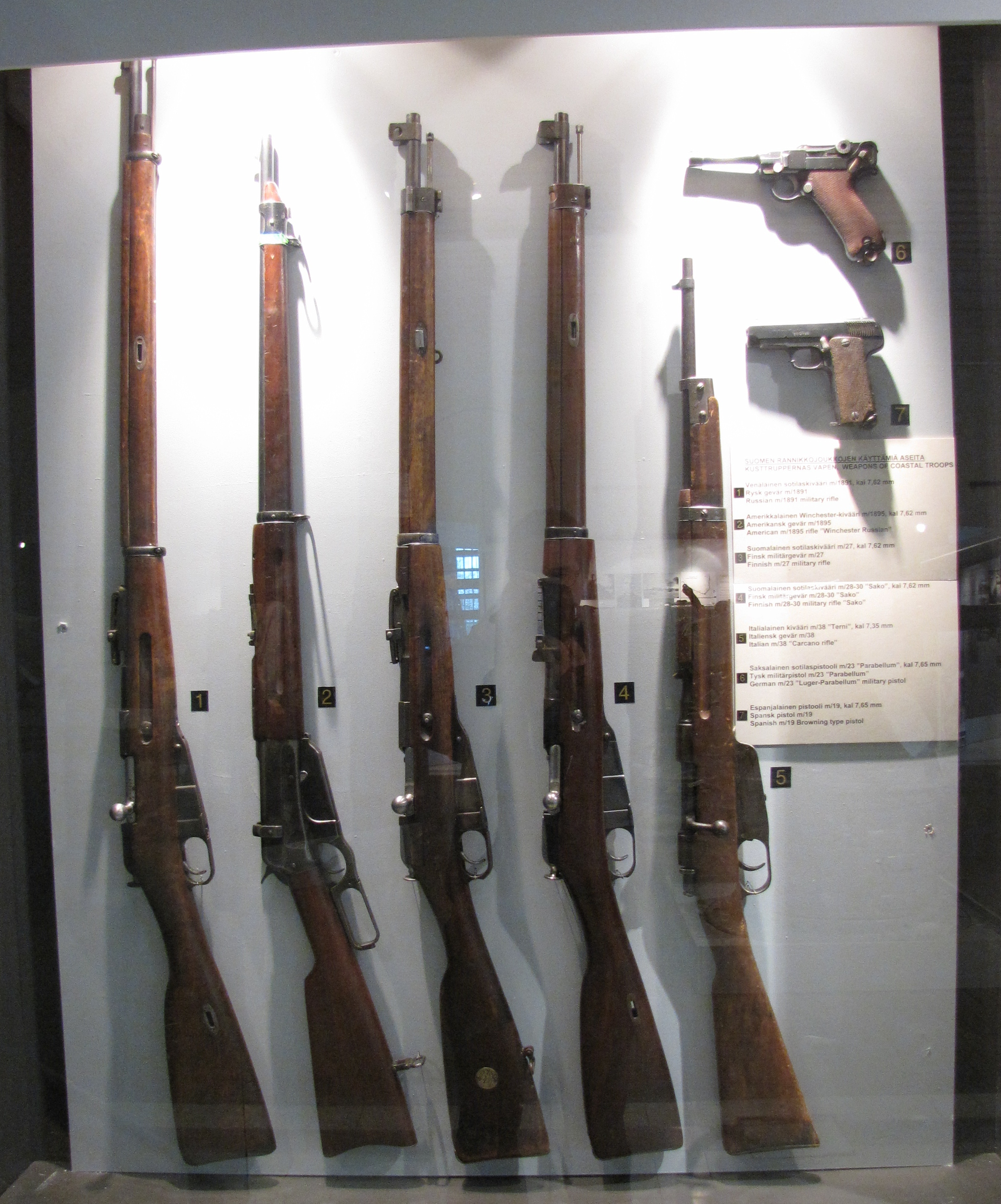
Winchester Model 1895 manufactured for the army of Russian Empire (second from the left).

Between 1915 and 1917 approximately 294,000 M1895s were manufactured for the airforce and police units of the Russian Empire, accounting for about 70% of total production of the rifles prior to 1932 when the M1895 was discontinued. Chambered in 7.62×54mmR, these versions were unusual for a lever-action rifle in that they also had a charger guide, allowing the M1895 rifle to be reloaded by the same charger clips used in the Mosin–Nagant bolt-action rifle. Rifles made for the Russian contract had a longer than standard barrel fitted with an extended forestock and bayonet lug. Initial delivery of the rifles was delayed because adaptation to Russian standards, particularly the charger guide, proved more difficult than expected. Additional delays resulted from incompetent and obstructive Russian inspectors, who refused to use Winchester-made test gauges despite no Russian gauges existing, insisted that test ammunition be shipped from Russia (instead of using readily available Winchester ammunition made on Russian contract), and often rejected rifles for irrelevant flaws such as wood grain in the stock being insufficiently straight. Winchester later sold these rejected rifles on the US commercial market. Russia issued many of their Winchester Model 1895 rifles to troops from Finland and the Baltic states, especially the Latvian Riflemen. At least 9,000 Model 1895 rifles are known to have been provided by the Soviet Union in 1936 to the Spanish Republicans for use in the Spanish Civil War.

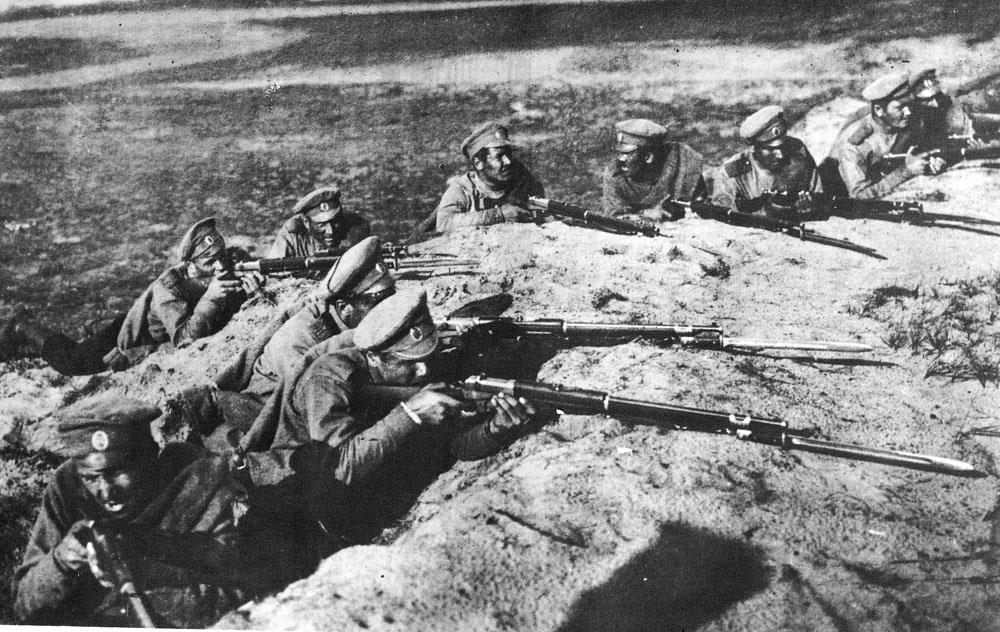
Russian troops in World War I with Winchester M1895 Rifles, 1916

Other nations adopted the rifle in more limited numbers. The United States ordered 10,000 in caliber .30/40 Krag for the Spanish–American War, but the war ended before they arrived at the front. These rifles were marked "U.S." atop the receiver ring and fitted with stock furniture similar to the M1895 Lee Navy including the short 8 5/16 inches (21.1 cm) knife-type bayonet. Many parts were marked "K.S.M." by ordnance inspector Kelly S. Morse. One hundred of these rifles were issued to the 33rd Volunteer Infantry for field testing in the Philippine–American War. The report of testing completed on 25 December 1899 stated the Krag–Jørgensen was greatly superior for military service. The remaining 9,900 rifles were sold to M. Harley Company and most were shipped to Cuba in 1906. Some of these rifles found their way to Mexico, where they were favored by Pancho Villa's troops during the Mexican Revolution.

Theodore Roosevelt also personally purchased an M1895 Winchester in .30 Army (.30-40 Krag) during the same timeframe. The Model 1895 in .30 Army was also entered into an 1896 New York National Guard rifle contract competition, but finished second to the Savage Model 1895 due to the Winchester rifle lacking a magazine cutoff and magazine counter. Winchester strongly disputed the results of the contest, arguing that the competition had been rigged in Savage's favor, and the ensuing political controversy led to the cancellation of the contract.

== Civilian ==
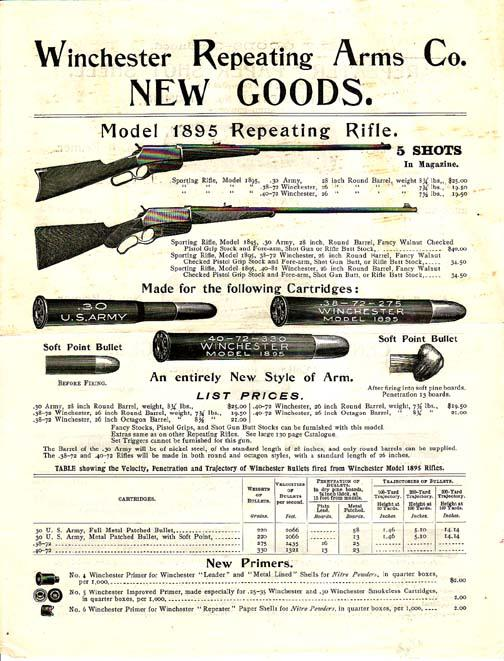
Advertisement of Winchester Model 1895.

As with previous Winchester rifles, a new serial number range was launched with the M1895, beginning with serial number 1. Including military contract rifles, a total of 425,881 rifles were produced, with production ceasing at serial number 425,132. The standard barrel length varied from 24 to 28 inches, depending on chambering and configuration, and the standard finish on all rifles was blue.

The rifle is most commonly associated today with former President Theodore Roosevelt; however, it was also used by many other famed hunters and adventurers, to include Martin and Osa Johnson, Charles Cottar, and author Stewart Edward White. Garrit Forbes—hunting companion of W. D. M. Bell, first cousin of Franklin D. Roosevelt, and long time personal friend of gun writer and firearms enthusiast Elmer Keith—recommended the M1895 in .405 Winchester to Theodore Roosevelt.

Theodore Roosevelt took two M1895 rifles with him on his 1909 safari to East Africa, both in .405 Winchester. Additionally, Kermit Roosevelt accompanied his father on the trip and brought two more M1895 rifles; one was chambered in .405 Winchester, and the other in .30-03 Springfield. While the serial number of Kermit's .30-03 has been lost, the serial numbers of the three .405 rifles are known to have been 63727, 63736, and 68180. Theodore Roosevelt praised the .405 M1895 in his book African Game Trails, famously referring to this rifle as his "'medicine gun' for lions":

But as we stood, one of the porters behind called out "Simba"; and we caught a glimpse of a big lioness galloping down beside the trees, just beyond the donga … Tarlton took his big double-barrel and advised me to take mine, as the sun had just set and it was likely to be close work; but I shook my head, for the Winchester .405 is, at least for me personally, the "medicine gun" for lions.

Although it is often said that Roosevelt called the .405 M1895 his "big medicine," this phrase is never used in African Game Trails, and is possibly the erroneous combination of his "medicine gun" quote with his "big stick" speech of 1901.

Kenneth Anderson, who was a writer and hunter, used his .405 Winchester during his shooting expeditions.

The Model 1895 in both its rifle and carbine configuration was popular with the Texas Rangers and Arizona Rangers in both the .30-40 Krag and .30-06 Springfield calibers.

In 1985, the Browning Arms Company reintroduced the M1895 rifle in .30-06 Springfield. Later in 2001, Winchester reintroduced the rifle during the 100 year anniversary of Theodore Roosevelt's presidential administration, offering it again in .405 Winchester, as well as .30-06 Springfield and .30-40 Krag since its reintroduction. In 2008 Winchester produced a pair of Theodore Roosevelt commemorative rifles. In 2009 an additional pair of rifles was offered commemorating Roosevelt's African Safari in 1909 after leaving office.

Both the Browning and new Winchester rifles are made in Japan by Miroku. The Winchesters, however, differ from the original design in that they feature rebounding hammers and a tang safety. Their triggers are also shaped differently, so they cannot be fitted into an original rifle.

== Users ==
- Finland Russian-contract rifles redesignated 7,62 kivääri/Winchester 95 (7,62 kiv/Winch.95).
- Honduras
- Mexico American-contract Spanish-American War surplus chambered in .30 Army.
- Nazi Germany: Captured Russian-contract rifles issued to Volkssturm units as the Gewehr 255(r).
- Russian Empire Substitute standard service rifles designated 7,62 mm vintovka obraztsa 1895 goda (7,62mm Vintovka obr. 95g) chambered in 7.62mm M91 Russian.
- Spanish Republic Soviet surplus Russian-contract rifles in 7.62mm M91 Russian given as military aid to the Republicans.
- United States: Issued to Texas Rangers in .30-40 Krag.
