= Colt Lightning rifle =

Slide action light rifle

Colt Lightning Rifle
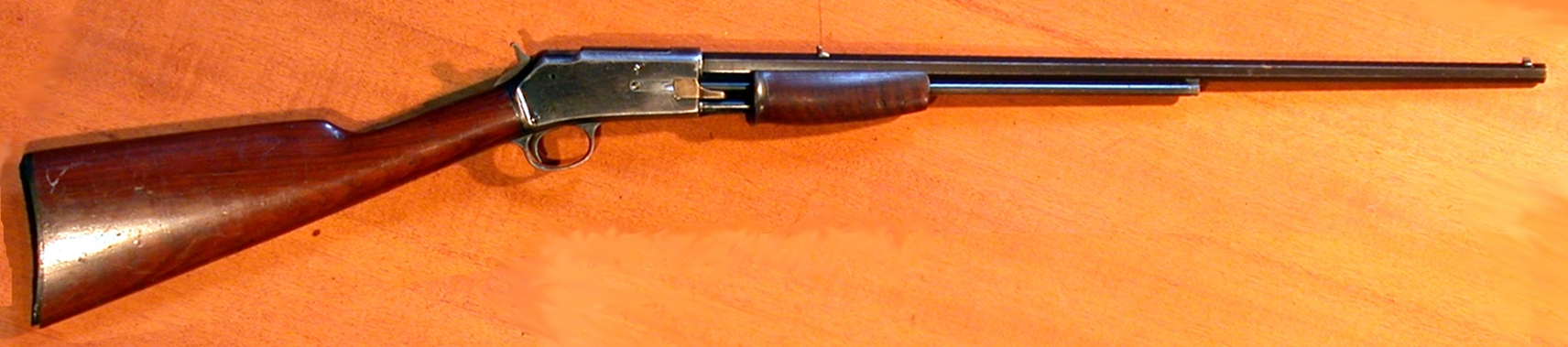
- Colt- Lightning .22 Rifle
- Type: Slide action Light Rifle
- Place of origin: United States

Service history
- Used by: United States; San Francisco Police Department
- Wars: Spanish-American War

Production history
- Manufacturer: Colt's Patent Firearms
- Produced: 1884–1904

Specifications
- Cartridge: .22 Short, .22 Long, .32-20, .38-40, .44-40, .38-56 WCF, .40-60 Winchester, .50-95 Express
- Barrels: Round, octagon
- Action: Slide
- Feed system: Tube magazine
- Sights: Iron

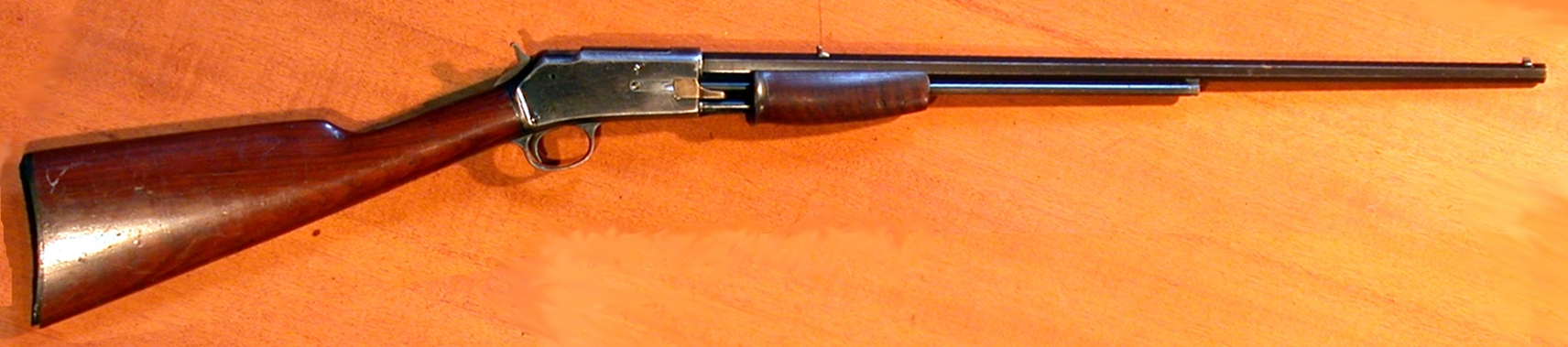
Colt Lightning cal .22 Rifle

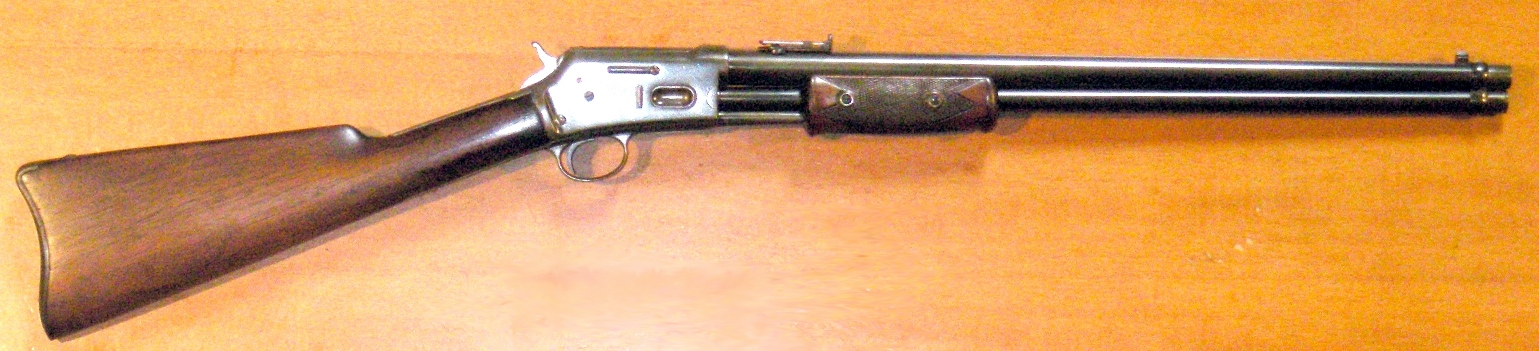
Colt-Lightning Carbine

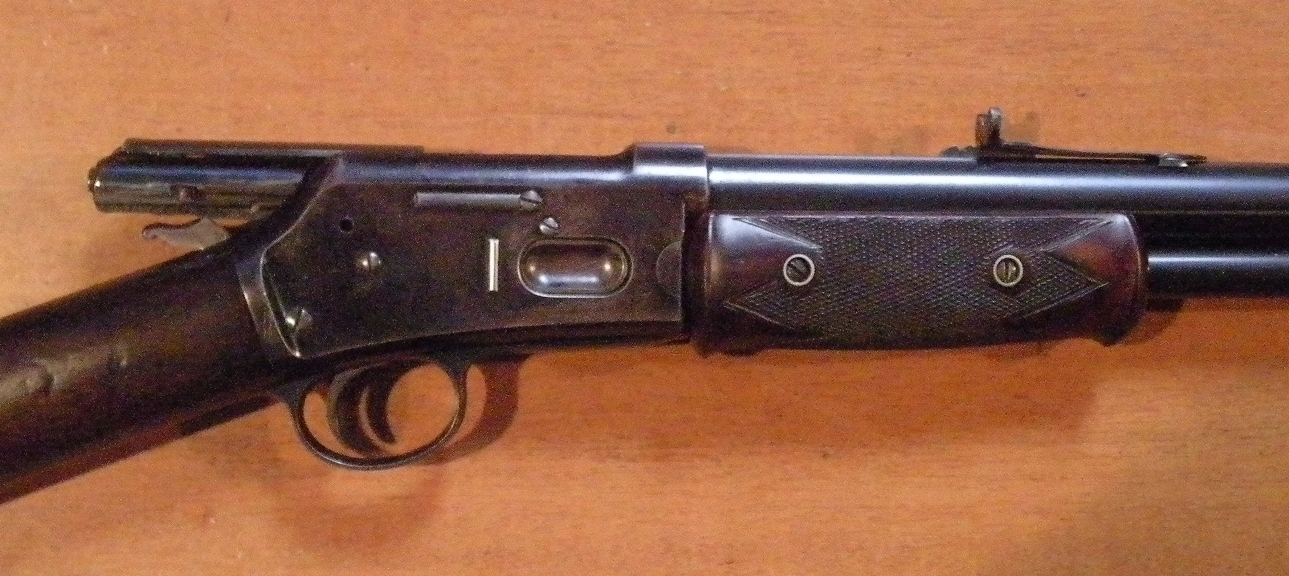
Colt-Lightning breech open

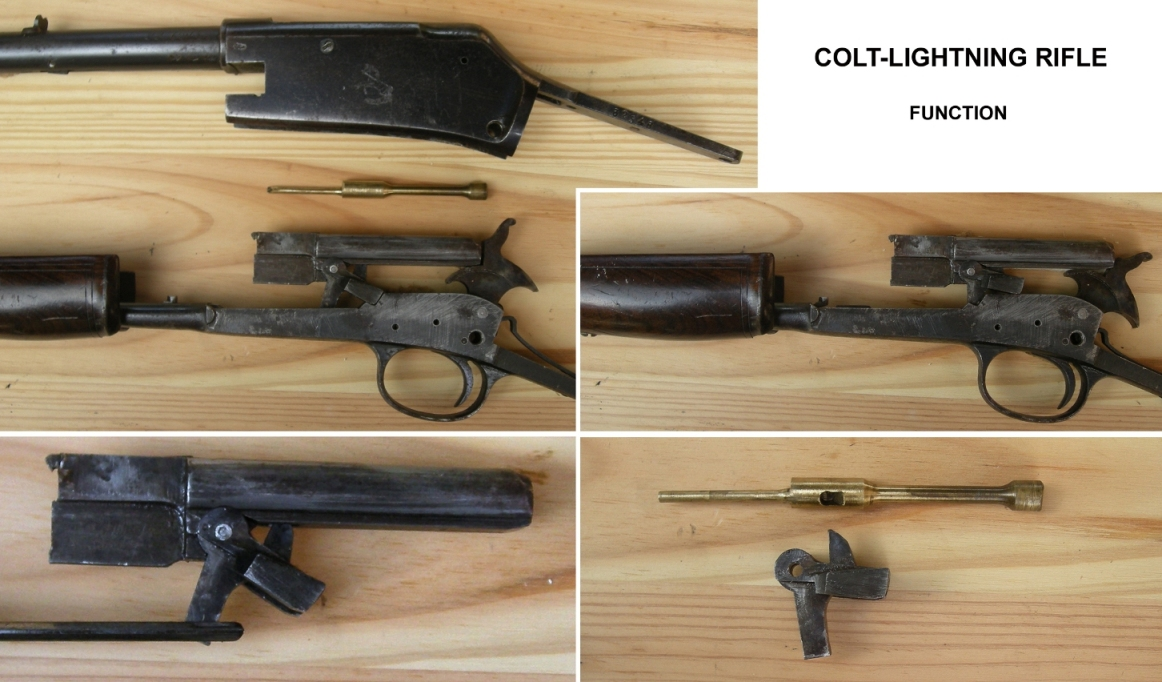
Colt-Lightning Rifle, function

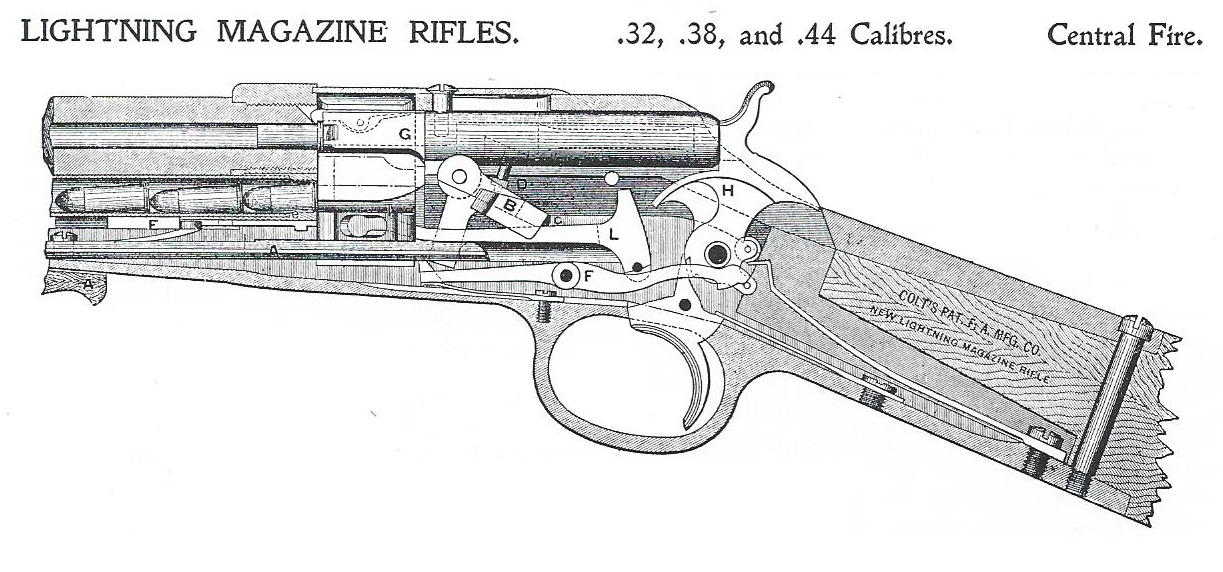
Colt Lightning Rifle, sectional view

The Colt Lightning Carbine or Colt Lightning Rifle was a slide-action (pump-action) rifle manufactured by Colt from 1884 until 1904 and was originally chambered in .44-40 caliber. Colt eventually made the Lightning Rifle in three different frame sizes, to accommodate a wide range of cartridges, from .22 Short caliber and .38-40 to .50-95 Express. Its profile resembles the pump-action rimfire rifles made by the Winchester Repeating Arms Company and Remington Arms. The Lightning saw use as a sporting arm in America and was adopted for use by the San Francisco Police Department, but was never as popular or as reliable as the various lever-action rifles of its day. It is however reported to have been used by American forces in the Spanish-American War, most likely as privately purchased weapons.

== Variants ==
The medium-frame Colt Lightning Magazine Rifle was manufactured between 1884 and 1904. It was the first slide-action rifle offered by Colt. Colt records indicate 89,777 were produced, in .32-20, .38-40, and .44-40 as a companion arm to the Colt Single Action Army revolver. Two versions were offered: a rifle with a 26 in (66 cm) barrel and 15-round magazine, and a carbine with a 20 in (51 cm) barrel and 12-round magazine. The San Francisco Police Department acquired 401 rifles all of which had 26 in (66 cm) round .44-40 barrels and bore S.F.P 1 through S.F.P 401 stampings on the lower tang.

The small-frame Lightning (also referred to as "Second Model Colt Lightning") was the first rimfire rifle made by Colt and was manufactured between 1887 and 1904 as a plinking and gallery gun. Colt records indicate 89,912 were made, in .22 Short and .22 Long. Barrel length was 24 in (61 cm) and the rifles had a blued finish, case-hardened hammer, and a walnut stock.

The large-frame Lightning (also called the "Express Model") was manufactured between 1887 and 1894. Colt records indicate 6,496 were made in different big game calibers such as .38-56 WCF, .40-60 and .50-95 Express. Barrel length was 22 or 28 in (56 or 71 cm).

== Modern versions ==
Reproduction Lightning rifles are still manufactured today by companies such as Uberti, Taurus, and Pedersoli for hunting, historical reenactment, and competition purposes such as Cowboy Action Shooting in calibers such as .38 Special/.357 Magnum, .44-40, and .45 Colt. Of these calibers, only the .44-40 was offered in the Lightning when it was originally produced by Colt.

== See also ==
- Colt-Burgess rifle
