= USFA =

- U.S. Fire Arms Manufacturing Company
- United States Fencing Association, the governing body for the sport of fencing in the United States
- United States Fire Administration, a United States government agency
- United States Food Administration
- United States Forces in Austria, in Allied-occupied Austria (1945-1955)
- Union Sportive des Forces Armées et Sécurité de Bamako, a Malian football club
- Union Sportive des Forces Armées Ouagadougou, a Burkinabé football club
- Uttarakhand State Football Association, the governing body for association football in Uttarakhand, India
