= Cowboy action shooting =

Competitive shooting sport

- Highest governing body: Single Action Shooting Society (SASS), Cowboy Action Shooting (CAS)
- Nicknames: SASS, CAS

Characteristics
- Contact: No
- Type: Shooting sport
- Equipment: Handgun, rifle, and shotgun

Presence
- Olympic: No
- World Championships: End of Trail World Championship of Cowboy Action Shooting
- Paralympic: No

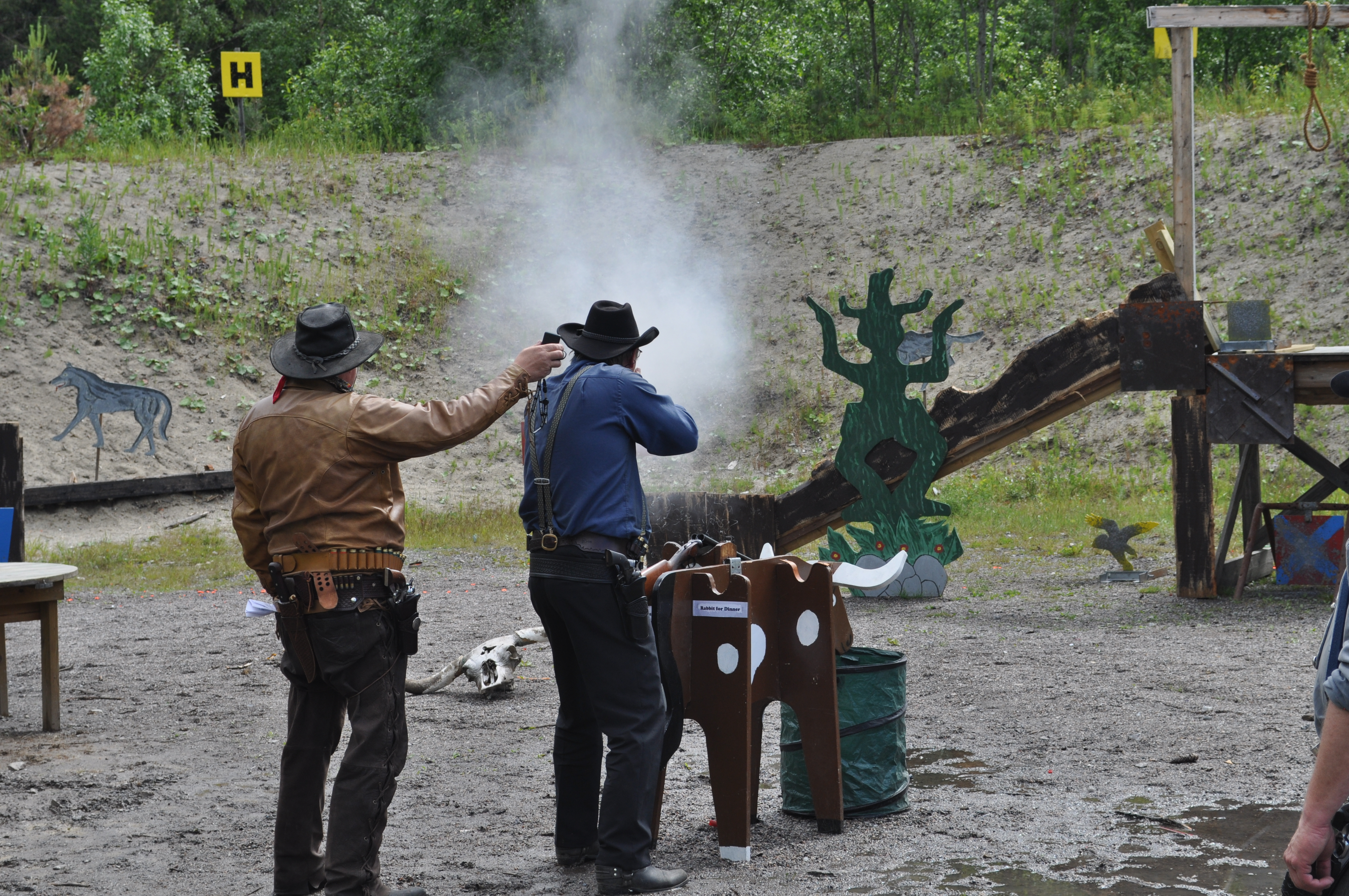
A CAS shooter engages a target with his lever-action rifle. To the left, the range officer with a timer that measures the shooter's stage time.

Cowboy action shooting (CAS, also known as Western action shooting, single action shooting, cowboy 3-gun, and Western 3-gun) is a competitive shooting sport that originated in 1981 at the Coto de Caza Shooting Range in Orange County, California. Cowboy action shooting is now practiced in many places with several sanctioning organizations including the Single Action Shooting Society (SASS), Western Action Shootists Association (WASA), and National Congress of Old West Shooters (NCOWS), and Single Action Shooting Australia (SASA).

Cowboy action shooting is a type of multigun match using a combination of handguns, rifles, and shotguns in a variety of "Old West-themed" courses of fire for time and accuracy. Participants must dress in appropriate themes or era costumes, as well as use gear and accessories as mandated by the respective sanctioning group rules.

== Firearms ==
CAS requires competitors to use firearms typical of the mid-to-late 19th century: single-action revolvers, lever-action rifles chambered in pistol calibers, and side-by-side double-barreled shotguns (also referred to as coach guns) with or without external hammers, although automatic ejectors are not allowed and Winchester 1897 pump-action shotguns with external hammers are allowed. Other Long guns, such as 1884 Colt Lightning slide-action rifles and Winchester 1887 lever-action shotguns are also allowed. Both original and reproduction guns are acceptable. All CAS handguns must be "single-action", meaning that the hammer must be manually cocked before each shot can be fired.

Competition in a CAS match generally requires four guns: two revolvers, a shotgun, and a rifle chambered in a centerfire revolver caliber of a type in use prior to 1899. Some CAS matches also offer side events for single-shot "buffalo rifles", derringers, speed shotgun, and other specialty shooting events. Replica firearms are available from companies such as Ruger, Colt, Uberti, Pedersoli, Stoeger, Chiappa, Pietta, Armi San Marco, and U.S. Fire Arms Mfg. Co.

== Costume ==
Competitors are required to wear an Old West-style or Victorian fashion outfit and apparel. One exception to this is that safety glasses and hearing protection must be worn when shooting. Depending on the standards of the sanctioning organization, clothing may be historically accurate for the late 19th century or may just be suggestive of the Old West. Some groups allow for costume similar to that worn by characters in a Western B-movie, such as Hopalong Cassidy or a television series like Gunsmoke.

== Alias ==
Participants must select an alias out of the Old West or have an "old west flair". Aliases are registered with the sanctioning body so they are unique to the participant. Many find it necessary to be creative in selecting an alias as virtually all historical names such as Wyatt Earp and Butch Cassidy have long since been claimed. Registered names cannot sound the same as another registered name.

== Competition ==
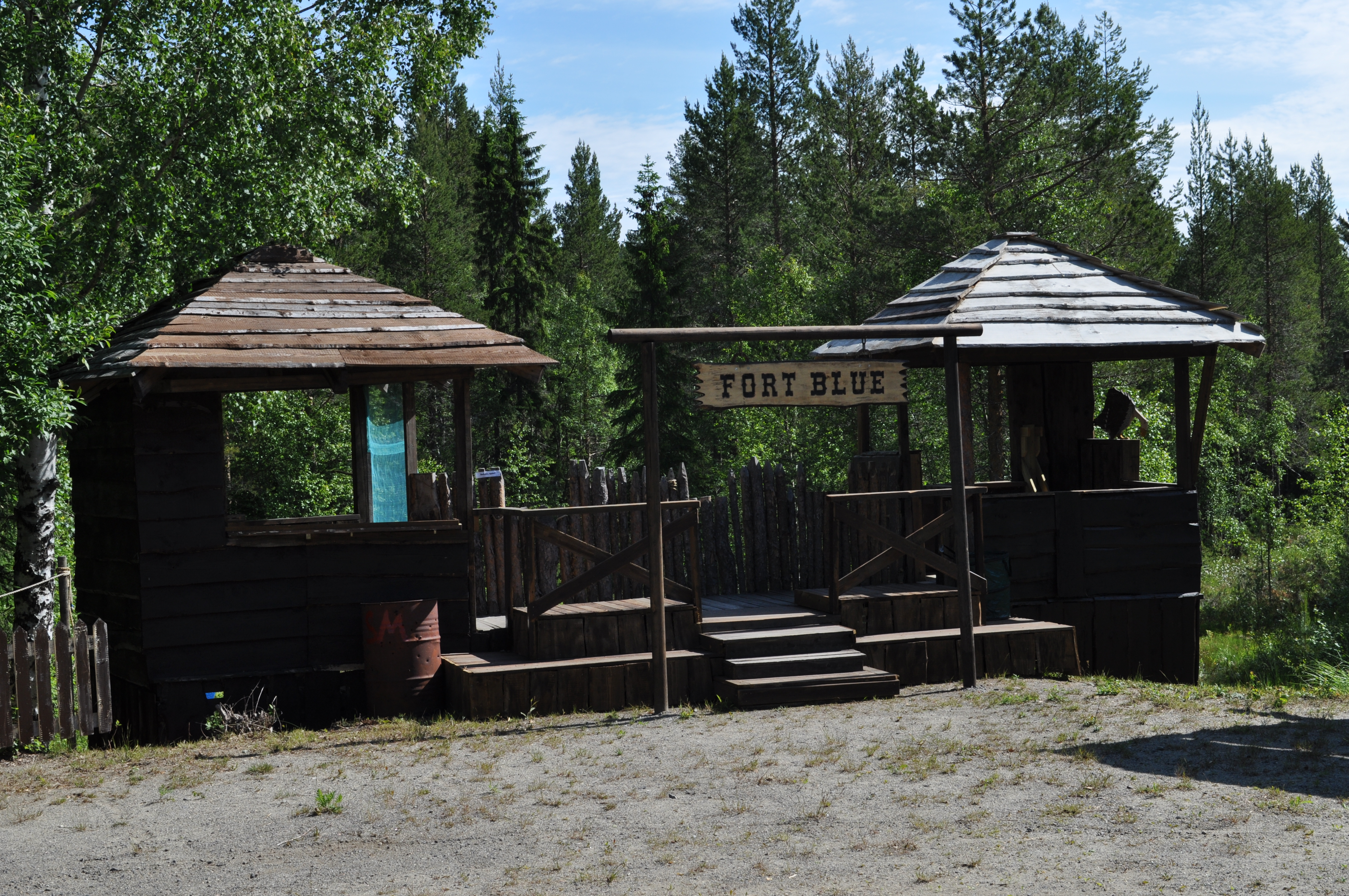
Props surrounding a CAS stage

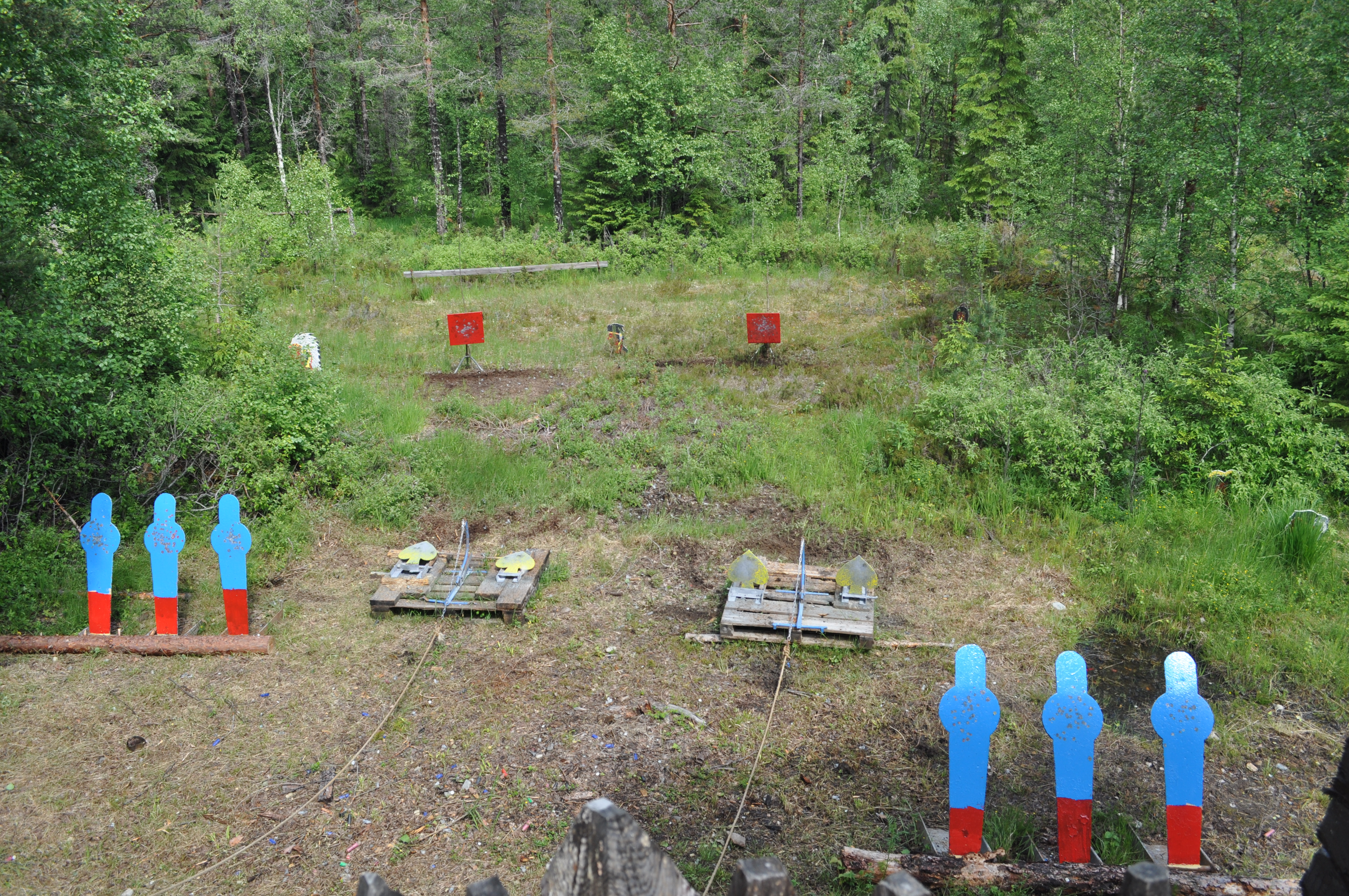
Steel targets down range at the stage. The shooter engages the targets with different weapons, using a rifle for the distant red targets, and revolvers for the closer blue targets.

Competition involves a number of separate shooting scenarios known as "stages". Stages are always different, each typically requiring ten revolver rounds (shooters generally carry two single-action revolvers), eight to ten rifle rounds, and two to eight shotgun rounds. Targets typically are steel plates that ring when hit. Sometimes, reactive targets such as steel knockdown plates or clay birds are used. Misses add five seconds to the competitor's time; safety violations and other procedural violations add 10 seconds. Competition is close and contested with the national and world championships attracting over 700 competitors.

=== Scoring ===
Shooters compete one at a time against the clock. Most matches are scored simply by "total time" minus bonuses and plus penalties. Other matches are scored by "rank points".

Shooters are timed using electronic timers, which record the duration for each stage to one one-hundredth of a second. The timer starts when the range officer pushes the button, which beeps to signal that the shooter may proceed. The timer has a built-in microphone and records the time when each shot happens. When there is no more noise, the timer continues to display the final time, which is the raw score.

Each shooter's "raw" time for the stage is increased by five seconds for each missed target and ten seconds for any procedural penalty incurred. The fastest adjusted time wins. Targets shot out of proper order incur a procedural penalty, though only one procedural penalty can be assessed per shooter per stage.

In "rank-point scoring" the top shooter of a match is determined by adding up each shooter's ranking for each stage, with the lowest score winning. For example, if a shooter places first in every stage in a 10-stage match, the shooter's score would be 10 (a 1 for each stage) and would be the lowest score possible. There is some controversy as to whether "rank points" or "total time" is a better system. SASS in 2017 moved to total time scoring and discarded the rank point scoring system.

=== Events ===
Every stage at a match is intended to be different. Sometimes, only two types of guns are used or perhaps even only one.Occasionally, a shooter is required to reload a firearm while being timed.

When coming to the line, the shooter places their guns as required by the stage description. When the competitor steps to the start position, the range officer conducting the stage asks if the shooter understands the course of fire and clarifies any questions the shooter may have. The range officer asks if the shooter is ready, tells the shooter to "stand by", and starts the timer within two to five seconds. When started, the timer gives an audible electronic tone, and the shooter begins the stage.

An example of a stage might have the shooter draw their first revolver and engage five steel targets, then holster their first revolver and move to the left to where their rifle is staged. They retrieve the rifle and engage the rifle targets, which are set farther away than the pistol targets. These might be nine separate targets, or perhaps three targets, which the shooter will "sweep" three times. They then lay the rifle back down on the hay bale with action open and chamber empty and run to the right where their shotgun is staged. Since shotguns are always staged open and empty, the shooter retrieves their gun and loads it with a maximum of two rounds (regardless of the type of shotgun) and engages two knock-down targets, reloads and engages two more knock-down targets (which must fall to score). The shooter then lays their open and empty shotgun back on the hay bale and draws their second revolver. This time the shooter engages three revolver targets in what is known as a "Nevada sweep" (left, center, right, center, left) for a total of five rounds.

After the competitor is finished shooting, the range officer tells the shooter to take their long guns and go to the unloading table where another shooter supervises the unloading and verifies that the guns are unloaded. The shooter's time is then recorded, and any misses or penalties are added. Targets are scored by three observers who count misses.

=== Major matches ===
End of Trail – World Championship of Cowboy Action Shooting at Ben Avery Shooting Range, Phoenix, Arizona, US

Land Run – United States National Championship of Cowboy Action Shooting at the Oklahoma City Gun Club, Arcadia, Oklahoma, US

Regionals – Western, Four Corners, Midwest, Northwest, Southwest, Southeast, and Northeast

State Championships – Each State holds their own respective state championship.

Australia National Championship. Australia and New Zealand also have their own respective state championships.

European National Championship – Days of Truth (DOT)

Many countries have their own respective national championship including: Australia, New Zealand, Canada, Czech Republic, Slovakia, Finland, France, Germany, Norway, Sweden, The Nederlands, Denmark, Italy, Hungary, South Africa, Switzerland, United Kingdom, and Serbia.

Other major matches:

Badlands Bar3 – Comin' Back At Cha

=== Safety ===
Foremost, safety glasses (shooting glasses) must be worn at all times. In a typical stage the shooter, who is next in line to compete, will load their guns at a loading table under the supervision of a designated loading official. Western-style "six-shooters" are always loaded with only five rounds with the empty chamber under the hammer. The shooter's rifle will also be loaded with the requisite number of rounds with the hammer down on an empty chamber. Shotguns are always left unloaded, then loaded "on the clock".

At a typical cowboy action range, all guns are kept unloaded except when the shooter prepares at the loading table, shoots the stage, then proceeds to the unloading table to unload the revolvers and prove that all guns are empty. Whether guns are loaded or empty, CAS emphasizes safety. Even with the theme of the Old West's cowboy attire, all shooters must wear safety glasses while on the firing line in addition to other important safety rules and more than some other shooting sports have. Many of these safety requirements are due to the nature of reproduction single action revolvers with fixed cylinders, and repeating rifles with non-removable tubular magazines.

The range officer is responsible for safely conducting the shooter through the stage. The range officer's attention is not on the targets but rather on the shooter and their firearms. One important duty of the range officer is to immediately stop the shooter if the shooter's gun or ammunition is defective in any potentially unsafe way.

=== Themes ===
In addition to requiring shooters to wear Old West attire, the Western theme of the matches is enhanced by having suitable targets and props for the stages. For example, a stage may be set in a bank and the shooter will be required to shoot through a barred "teller" window, then perhaps retrieve a "sack of gold" from a safe and carry it in one hand while shooting with their other hand. Another stage may have a shooter rescuing a baby (doll) and having to carry the "child" through the entire stage while engaging the targets. Other props may include buckboards, chuck wagons, stagecoaches, and "horses" as well as jail cells, oak barrels, hitching posts, swinging saloon doors, etc.

=== Prizes ===
No money or merchandise prizes are offered in CAS, but often there are drawings and prizes, ensuring a more family-oriented sport.

== Categories ==
All of the below categories may also be shot as lady categories; there is no men's category (all are considered open), and ladies may shoot in open categories.

There are many other categories, especially at the local level, but the below are representative of the main types of categories one finds at cowboy action shooting events.

- Buckaroo/Buckarette: 13 and under
- Junior boy/Junior girl: 16 and under
- Cowboy / Cowgirl – shooters of all ages
- Wrangler/Lady wrangler: age 36 and up
- Forty-niner/Lady forty-niner: age 49 and up
- Senior/Lady senior: age 60 and up
- Silver senior/Lady silver senior: age 65 and up
- Elder statesman/Grand dame: age 70 and up
- Cattle baron/Cattle baroness: age 75 and up
- El patron/La patrona: age 80 and up
- El rey/La reina: age 85 and up
- B-Western – Shooters wear clothing inspired by the B-Western films of the 1930s and 1940s, starring Roy Rogers, William "Hopalong Cassidy" Boyd, and others. "Buscadero" type gunbelt/holster rigs are required, and the shooter must wear spurs.
- Classic cowboy/Classic cowgirl – Shooters have specific clothing requirements and shoot Duelist or Double Duelist style using .40 caliber or larger, rimmed cartridges; shotguns must be external hammer double barrel, single shot, or lever actions
- Frontier cartridge – Shooters use black powder rather than smokeless powder in all their guns
- Frontiersman – Shooters use cap and ball revolvers, shot duelist style, and side-by-side double-barrel or lever-action shotguns

Categories based on how the shooter fires their guns

- Duelist/Double duelist– Shooter uses only one hand to fire revolvers
- Gunfighter – Shooter uses two revolvers at once when the stage allows, otherwise shoots right-side revolver with right hand only and left-side revolver with left hand only

In addition to percussion (cap and ball) weapons, many firearms are center-fire .32 caliber or larger with revolvers and rifles chambered in .38 Special and .45 Colt being very popular. Ammunition is generally loaded at medium to full power levels, although many junior shooters or women prefer to shoot lighter calibers (such as .32 and .38). A noted trend among some shooters is to use light loads to reduce recoil and improve their times. This tends to run contrary to the "spirit of the game".

== Wild bunch ==
One variant of CAS, currently sanctioned by SASS, is wild bunch action shooting; inspired by the 1969 western film The Wild Bunch.

=== Firearms ===
According to SASS, this form uses "firearms typical of those used in the taming of the Old West just after the turn of the 20th century". The revolvers used in normal SASS events are replaced with a 1911 pistol; lever-action rifles remain in use, while only Winchester Model 1897 and Winchester Model 1912 pump-action shotguns are allowed. As in traditional CAS, originals and replicas are acceptable.

In SASS Wild Bunch matches, pistols must be chambered in .45 ACP, rifles must be chambered for pistol cartridges of .40 caliber or greater, and shotguns must be 12 gauge. All ammunition for pistols or rifles must also meet a minimum power factor of 150, calculated by multiplying the bullet weight in grains and the muzzle velocity in feet per second and then dividing the result by 1,000. Additionally, maximum muzzle velocities are limited to 1,000 ft/s (300 m/s) for pistol ammunition and 1,400 ft/s (430 m/s) for rifle ammunition.

=== Sanctioned categories ===
Wild bunch has two primary SASS-sanctioned categories based upon the style of 1911 pistol and the shooter's grip style that are used. Each main category has respective divisions for men, women and junior participants.

• Traditional – Uses an original-design M1911/M1911A1 pistol, and the participant must use a traditional one-handed grip.

• Modern – Uses either an original-design M1911/M1911A1 pistol or a modern-style 1911 pistol. Participants may use either a traditional one-handed or a modern two-handed grip.

=== Unsanctioned categories ===
In recent years, various clubs that host wild bunch matches have begun expanding and developing other categories using various other rifles in lieu of a pistol-caliber lever-action rifle. Though these categories are not yet officially sanctioned by SASS, they have proven to be quite popular with participants in the sport.

• Doughboy – Named after the famed infantryman of World War I, this category uses the bolt-action military rifles of the era. Rifles such as the M1903/M1903A3 Springfield, Mosin-Nagant M1891, Karabiner Model 1931 (K31), as well as various Lee-Enfield, Schmidt-Rubin, Arisaka and other World War I bolt-action rifles, are permitted.

• Teddy Roosevelt – Named after the 26th president of the United States, and, notably, the leader of the 1st United States Volunteer Cavalry; known as the "Rough Riders". This category uses a rifle-caliber lever-action rifle chambered in cartridges such as 30–30 Winchester and 45-70.

• Audie Murphy – Named after the heralded World War II veteran and Medal of Honor recipient, this category uses a semiautomatic M1 carbine rifle chambered in the .30 Carbine cartridge.

Wild bunch also uses the M1 Garand in Garand action military match (GAMM) side matches.

=== Costume ===
In SASS-sanctioned wild bunch shooting events, the typical attire worn by participants is that of early-20th century military, late-19th to early-20th century western (such as that worn in the film The Wild Bunch), Roosevelt's "Rough Riders", or Mexican period.

== Cowboy mounted shooting ==
An offshoot of cowboy action shooting is cowboy mounted shooting, also sometimes called Western mounted shooting, or simply mounted shooting. Events require that the contestant ride a horse through a course of fire while carrying the same guns used in cowboy action shooting. The rider shoots up to ten balloon targets. Events use blank ammunition certified to break a target balloon within twenty feet instead of live rounds.

== See also ==
- List of shooting sports organizations
- Bridgeport rig
