= USFA ZiP .22 =

Semi-automatic handgun manufactured by U.S. Fire Arms Manufacturing Company

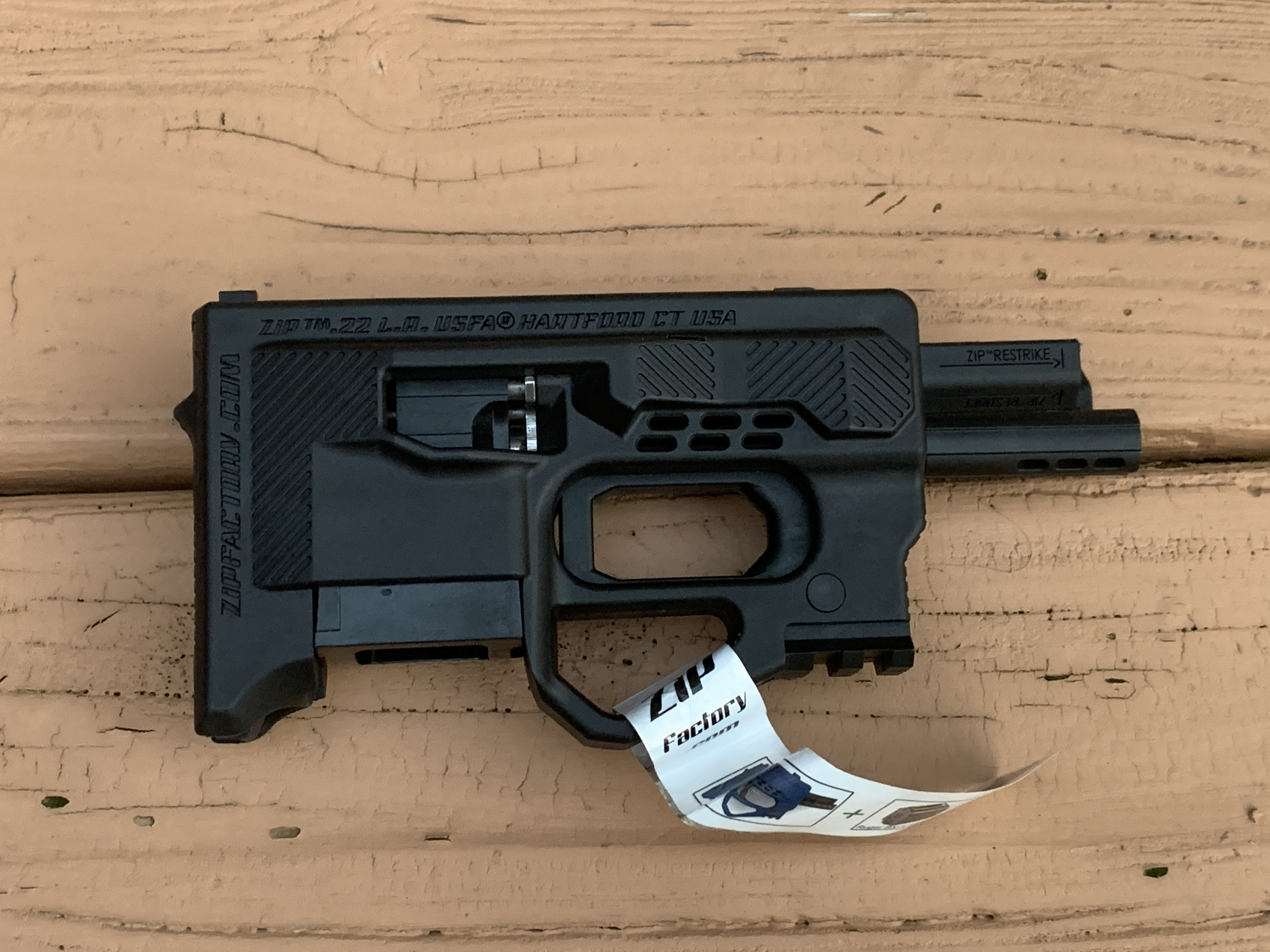
- The ZiP .22 LR
- Type: Semi-automatic pistol rifle receiver (proposed)
- Place of origin: United States

Production history
- Designer: Douglas Donnelly
- Designed: c. 2011
- Manufacturer: U.S. Fire Arms Manufacturing Company
- Unit cost: $199 (MSRP)
- Produced: c. 2013–2014
- Variants: 1

Specifications
- Mass: 0.95 lb (0.43 kg)
- Length: 7.25 in (184 mm)
- Barrel length: 5.25 in (133 mm)
- Width: 1.2 in (30 mm)
- Height: 3.1 in (79 mm)
- Cartridge: .22 Long Rifle
- Caliber: .22 in (5.6 mm)
- Barrels: 1
- Action: Straight blowback
- Feed system: Vertical
- Sights: Notch and blade

The Zip .22 (stylized as ZiP) is a semi-automatic pistol chambered in .22 Long Rifle, commercially introduced by the U.S. Fire Arms Manufacturing Company (USFA) in 2013. Although given some praise for its innovative concept, affordability and accuracy, it was widely panned for its frequent mechanical malfunctions and questionable ergonomics, with failures to feed ammunition and eject spent casings being reported by a large number of shooters. The poor reliability of this gun made it a commercial failure, causing the eventual demise of USFA in 2017.

== Design ==
The ZiP .22 is a straight blowback-operated semi-automatic handgun in a configuration, with a box-shaped, futuristic-styled polymer frame featuring two holes for the trigger and the user's middle finger, and a flat buttplate on which the shooter's palm rests. It has simple notch and blade sights, and uses Ruger 10-22 removable magazines, with the 10-round rotary magazine being the default. The bolt of the firearm has two trapezoidal bars extending out the front of the housing along the length of nearly the entire barrel; pushing these in towards the shooter is the only way to cycle the action. This design choice drew significant criticism, because it required the shooter to place their hand next to the muzzle in order to chamber a new round, putting them at risk of injury from accidental or negligent discharges. The shorter of the two rods is designed to reset the striker without fully cycling the weapon and ejecting a round; however, the restrike mechanism frequently causes the weapon to attempt to feed a live round into an already-loaded chamber, leading to jams. The firearm lacks an extractor, meaning that case extraction relies solely on direct blowback, which was blamed for the ZiP's frequent tendency to malfunction when firing.

The firearm was designed to act as the receiver portion of a modular weapon system, which could be built up according to the shooter's needs using a wide range of drop-in expansions. The standard iron sights, mounted on a removable plate, could be swapped out for enhanced sights that glowed in the dark, or a picatinny or scope rail that would allow the mounting of optics.

Another rail accessory allowed the ZiP .22 to attach to the underside of a rifle, similar to underslung shotgun designs, in order to provide additional firepower. The ZiP .22 could also itself be converted into a rifle through the addition of a carbine stock and a suppressor, although these accessories as well as a .22WMR conversion kit never made it past the prototype stage due to the commercial failure of the weapon.

== Production history ==
The ZiP .22 was first revealed to the public in an attempted viral marketing stunt, when a YouTube user, believed to be designer and company CEO Douglas Donnelly, uploaded a video titled "Unidentified Firing Object", which showed the gun in action at a range. After some speculation about the identity of the firearm, USFA announced plans for its production in late 2012.

The development of the ZiP .22 was a big risk for USFA, a gunmaker that had made a name for itself with its highly regarded replicas of the Colt Single Action Army and other historic guns. The gun, although able to be sold at a low price, required very expensive polymer moulding equipment to produce, the cost of which would require USFA to sell off their Single Action Army production tooling. The company nonetheless took this risk, intending to restart production of replica guns with newly purchased tools once the ZiP .22 had turned a profit. This decision would lead to the company's demise after the ZiP .22 failed on the market. Production of the gun stopped in 2014. USFA itself shut down in 2017, unable to return to production of more successful products.
