= Colt-Burgess rifle =

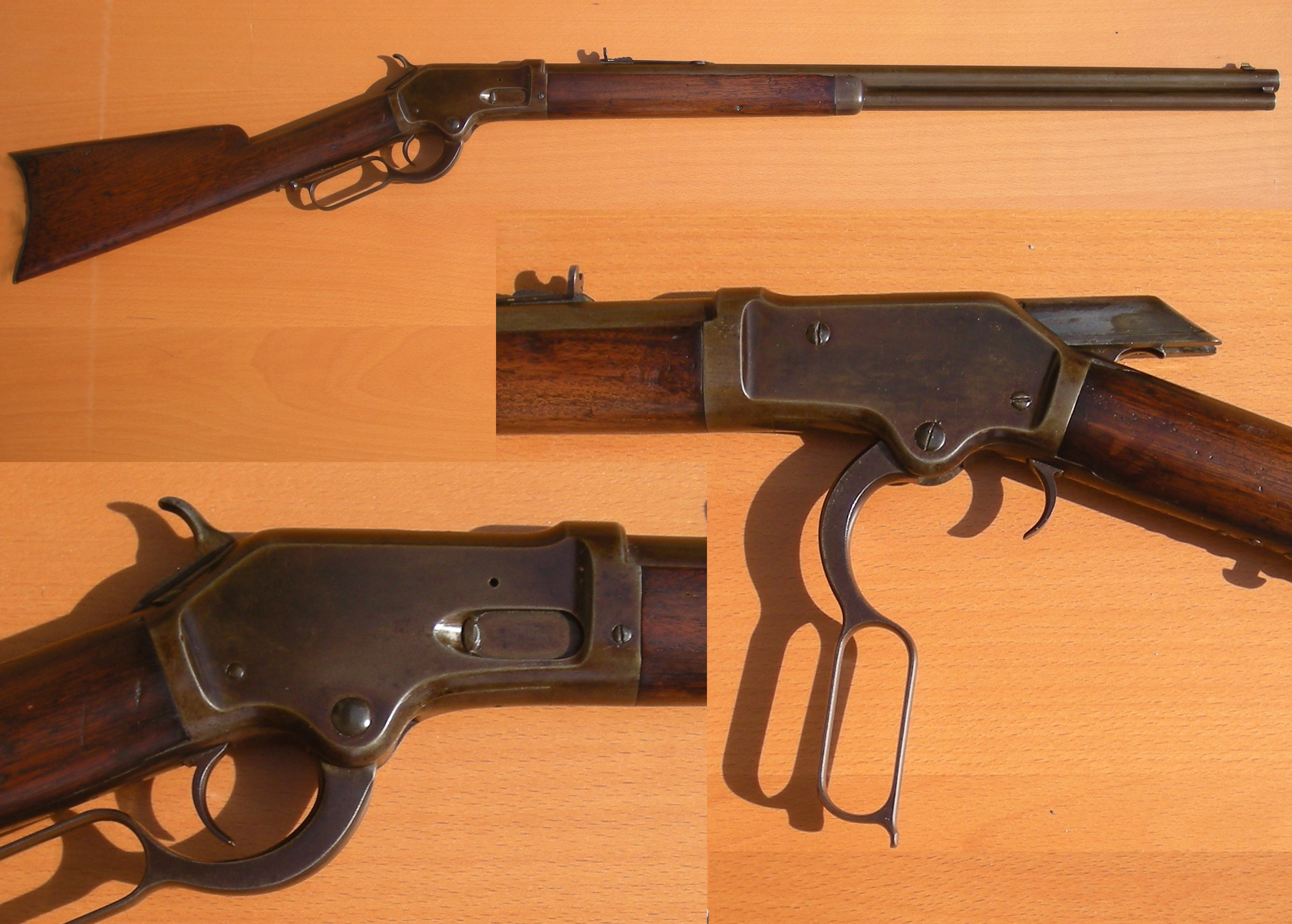
- Colt-Burgess rifle
- Type: Lever-action rifle
- Place of origin: United States

Production history
- Designer: Andrew Burgess
- Manufacturer: Colt's Patent Firearms Manufacturing Company
- Produced: 1883–1885
- No. built: 6,403

Specifications
- Mass: 8 3/4 lb (4.0 kg) (octagon barrel rifle); 8 1/2 lb (3.9 kg) (round barrel rifle); 7 1/4 lb (3.3 kg) (carbine)
- Length: 42 3/4 in (1,090 mm)
- Barrel length: 25 1/2 in (650 mm) (rifle); 20 in (510 mm) (carbine)
- Cartridge: .44-40 Winchester
- Action: Lever-action
- Feed system: 15 round (rifle) or 12 round (carbine) tubular magazine

The Colt-Burgess rifle, also known as the 1883 Burgess rifle or simply the Burgess rifle, is a lever-action repeating rifle produced by Colt's Patent Firearms Manufacturing Company between 1883 and 1885. The Burgess rifle was Colt's only entrance into the lever-action rifle market, produced to compete with Winchester Repeating Arms Company's line of popular rifles. The 1883 Burgess rifle was designed and patented by Andrew Burgess, an American firearms designer and photographer, who sold the design to Colt.

== Overview ==
The Colt-Burgess rifle is similar in design to Winchester's lever-action rifles, such as the Winchester Model 1873. It was produced in two versions chambered for the .44-40 Winchester cartridge: a rifle version with a 25 1/2 in (650 mm) barrel, and a carbine with a 20 in (510 mm) barrel. The rifle features either a full octagon, half-octagon, or round barrel, with the full octagon barrels being the most numerously produced among rifle variants. A tubular magazine is located under the barrel in similar fashion to other lever-action rifles with a capacity of 15 rounds in the rifle version or 12 rounds in the carbine version. The receiver on the Burgess rifle is smaller than the Winchester 1873's, providing for a lighter firearm. The rifle's action, though similar to the Winchester 1873's, is considered to be a stronger design. The action utilizes a toggle-joint system to lock the breechblock. The extension of the loading lever is the lower part of the toggle-joint; the upper part of the toggle-joint is linked to the breechblock. Located on the receiver is a sliding loading gate from which cartridges are fed into the magazine; the sliding gate design is in contrast to Winchester's tilting gate. Burgess rifles were finished with either a blued or browned barrel, blued receiver, casehardened hammer and lever, and walnut stock. Current reproduction Burgess rifles are also available with casehardened frames.

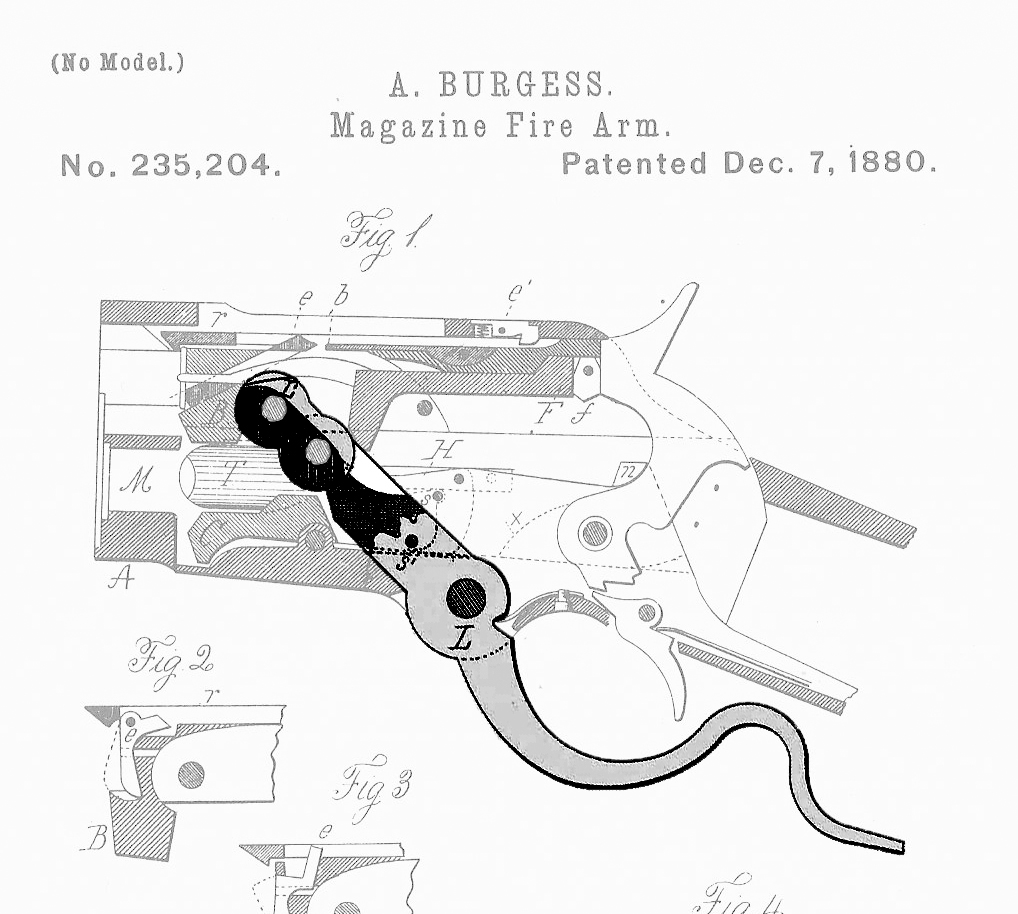
Colt Burgess toggle-joint

== Production ==
Although Colt predominantly was a manufacturer of popular revolvers, such as the Colt Single Action Army, the company began in the 1880s to seek to compete against Winchester in the rifle market. In 1882, Colt contacted Andrew Burgess to design a lever-action rifle. Factory records list two entries for serial number 1: a rifle shipped to Hartley & Graham in New York on May 4, 1883, and a saddle ring carbine shipped two weeks later. A total of 6,403 Colt Burgess rifles and carbines were manufactured before production ended in 1885. Approximately 60% of these were of the rifle variation. When compared to production figures of Winchester's 1873 rifle, the Colt-Burgess failed as a serious competitor to Winchester. From 1873 to 1919, Winchester manufactured 720,610 Model 1873 rifles, or an average of over 15,000 per year.

The short production history of the Colt-Burgess has led to much speculation as to the reason of its demise. According to legend, upon hearing of Colt's entrance into the lever-action rifle market, Winchester began to develop a prototype revolver to compete with Colt's market. A "gentleman's agreement" then followed between Colt and Winchester, with Colt agreeing to drop production of the Burgess and Winchester abandoning its plans to develop a revolver. The truth of this story has never been fully verified, and as such, the reason for the Burgess rifle's short production history is unknown. Colt notably introduced the Lightning Magazine Rifle in 1884 and may have been focusing their attention on their new product.

Replicas of the Burgess rifle and carbine are currently produced by the Italian manufacturer Uberti chambered for the .45 Colt cartridge.

== See also ==
- Colt Lightning Carbine
