= A. Uberti =

Italian replica firearm manufacturer

A. Uberti S.p.A.
- Type: Società per azioni
- Industry: Firearms
- Founded: Gardone Val Trompia, 1959; 67 years ago
- Founder: Aldo Uberti
- Headquarters: Brescia, Italy
- Products: Replica firearms
- Parent: Beretta Holding
- Website: www.ubertireplicas.com

A. Uberti S.p.A., is an Italian manufacturer of replicas of 19th century American percussion revolvers, carbines, and rifles as well as cartridge revolvers, single-shot rifles, and lever-action rifles. These replicas are commonly used by historical re-enactors, participants in action shooting sports such as cowboy action shooting, working ranchers and target shooters who prefer traditional-style firearms.

Uberti is located in Gardone V.T., a suburb of Brescia, Italy, for centuries the home to other firearm manufacturers and similar craft businesses. Independent for many years, Uberti was purchased and made into a subsidiary of Beretta Firearms and subsequently acquired by Benelli, also a member of the Beretta Holding Company.

== Origins and history ==
Aldo Uberti (d. 1998) founded his company in the foothills of the Italian Alps in 1959 to recreate long-obsolete but iconic firearms from the days of the American West and the U.S. Civil War. The factory was (and still is) in Gardone Val Trompia (Gardone V.T.) in the province of Brescia, an area renowned for arms and armor manufacturing since the late Middle Ages. In particular, a manufacturing tradition of that area (dating back to the Renaissance) has been that of replicating foreign-style armor, most notably armor in the German style to be exported to and used in Germanic countries. This was done in part to help establish the area as an important arms-manufacturing center, which it remains today, and in part to showcase the ability of local artisans and metalsmiths.

Aldo Uberti had attended the Zanardelli gunsmithing school, and by age 14 he was already apprenticing with Beretta, a determining factor in his early career. He founded Uberti on the eve of the U.S. Civil War's 100th anniversary, when he was approached by U.S. businessman Val Forgett Jr. who wanted to cater to the budding but promising reenactment market. Forgett had first worked with Luciano Amadi of Beretta. At the time, Beretta was not interested in producing percussion revolver reproductions, so Forgett and Amadi had joined with parts maker Vittorio Gregorelli; eventually the team brought in Aldo Uberti to work on a replica of the 1851 Colt Navy revolver. The first deal was signed in 1958, for 6,000 revolvers to be delivered in 1959, with Gregorelli and Uberti responsible for manufacturing and packaging for export and Forgett handling U.S. marketing and distribution through his new company, Navy Arms. That first replica was followed by other Colt civil-war-era models; later, Uberti moved on to Remington and Winchester designs. It was during this era that Colt ceased production of their famous Single Action Army or "Peacemaker" revolvers.

By the 1970s, Uberti had grown into an internationally recognized producer of Civil-War and Old West firearms, with high quality standards and a marked preference for forging their receivers out of solid steel rather than using casting or alloys. In the year 2000, Uberti was acquired by Beretta, thanks to whose substantial financing it upgraded the factory to a brand-new facility, thereby greatly expanding production capacity. By 2002, the factory was further modernized with CNC machinery; this enabled them to expedite certain manufacturing processes, although an amount of hand-fitting and hand-finishing remains necessary to this day for this type of firearm.

== Uberti in American western movies ==
Uberti firearms have been featured in numerous Western movies thanks to their authentic looks. Italian filmmaker Sergio Leone visited the Uberti factory in the 1960s to procure replica Civil War and Old West revolvers for use in all his Western films including The Good, the Bad and the Ugly and Once Upon a Time in the West. Other movie credits include Uberti's Colt Walker featured in John Wayne's 1969 True Grit, as well as the same model in Clint Eastwood's The Outlaw Josey Wales (1979). All firearms in the 1990 Western Dances with Wolves starring Kevin Costner were Ubertis, while a number of Uberti rifles and pistols have also been used in the 1993 film Tombstone featuring Val Kilmer and Kurt Russell.

== Current production ==
Today, Uberti caters to collectors, cowboy action shooters, civil war skirmishers as well as working ranchers, hunters and other outdoorsmen who need or prefer to carry traditional firearms into the field. Historically, Uberti has produced parts such as frames, cylinders, and barrels for several other manufacturers like Beretta, Taurus, Charles Daly, Colt and USFA, while current firearms made by the company are offered under both the Uberti brand names and those of importers Cimarron and Taylor's.

Because of modern steels and experienced craftsmen, Uberti's replicas are highly regarded among shooters and collectors, sometimes thought as surpassing the originals in quality. It is for this reason that Uberti has been called "The King of Replicas" by U.S. shooters and collectors. Furthermore, Uberti's fidelity to the originals is such that many internal parts of their current Colt replica may be interchanged with those of an original first-generation Single Action Army.

Following is a list of firearm categories currently available from Uberti:

Handguns

- Black powder revolvers (1847 to 1860s), Colt and Remington models
- Black powder conversion revolvers (late 1860s to early 1870s), Colt and Remington models
- Colt Single Action Army cartridge revolver and variants (1873 to 1890s)
- Remington 1875 New Army cartridge revolver and variants (1875 to 1890)
- Smith & Wesson top-break cartridge revolver and variants (1875)
- Specialized Colt Single Action Army revolvers optimized for Cowboy Mounted Shooting and Cowboy Action Shooting
- .22 Caliber single-action revolver (6 to 12-shot models)

Rifles and carbines

- 1860 Henry
- 1866 Yellowboy
- 1871 Remington Rolling Block rifles and carbines
- 1873 Winchester Model 1873 rifles and carbines
- 1873 Springfield model 1873 rifles and carbines
- 1874 Sharps rifle and carbines
- 1876 Winchester "Centennial"
- 1883 Colt Burgess
- 1884 Colt Lightning rifle
- 1885 Winchester High Wall
- 1886 Winchester model 1886

== Current U.S. importers ==
The long and varied history of Uberti importers has sometimes created confusion in the mind of the U.S. customer, with unfounded rumors about quality differences between the lines offered through various importers. The reason is that the product has been often marketed under the importer's name (e.g., Navy Arms, Cimarron, etc.) rather than the manufacturer's, with each importer naturally positioning their product as being the best.

Currently, Uberti firearms come into the United States through three main importers. The first and largest is Stoeger (under the brand Uberti USA), a member of the same parent company (Benelli, in turn a member of the Beretta Holding Company). In this case, Stoeger does not act as a brand, but only as a) the FFL under which the Uberti firearms are imported, which is why these are the only Uberti firearms to be openly marketed under the Uberti brand; and b) the company handling the 5-year warranty. The second is Taylor's, a Virginia-based company that caters in particular to cowboy-action shooters, reenactors and collectors. The third is Cimarron Arms, a Texas-based company also specializing in the Cowboy-action market.

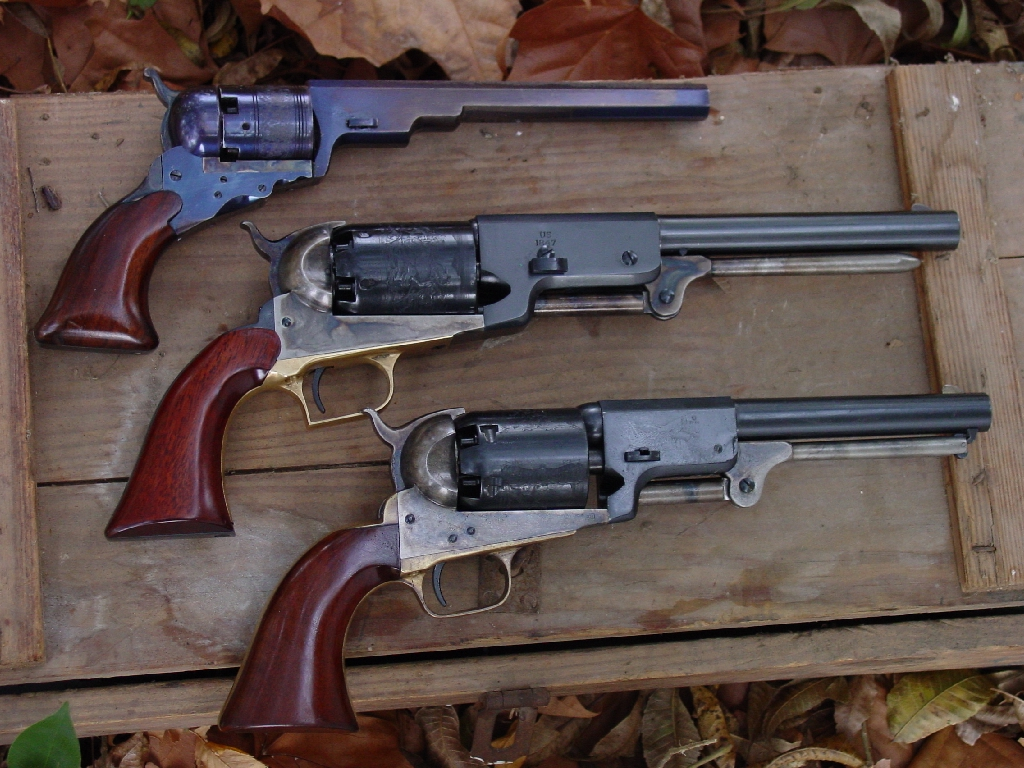
Uberti Percussion revolver including top to bottom, Colt Paterson, Colt Walker, Colt 3rd Variation Revolving Holster Pistol (Dragoon)

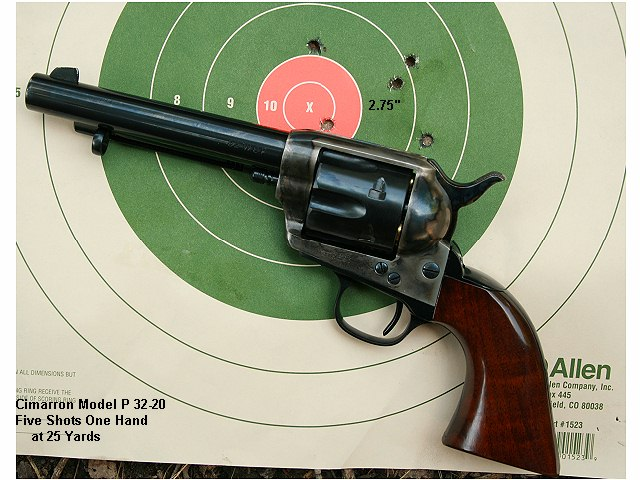
A Uberti-made Cimarron Model P in 32-20/32 WCF

== Business units and corporate ownership ==
The Beretta Holding Company acquired Uberti with the goal of dominating the market niche of replica firearms (particularly in the U.S.).

According to the then CEO of Beretta Holding, Dott. Piero Gussalli Beretta, "the objective of this acquisition [was] that of leading the Beretta group onto the stage of America's most genuine tradition of cowboy-type firearms and shooting, through a brand that is comparable to Beretta in quality and prestige." A year after the acquisition (2001), Uberti netted a record of $15M. The current Uberti CEO is Mr. Angelo Merlino.

Today, the U.S. subdivision of Uberti is located in Accokeek, Maryland, within the Benelli U.S. main offices. Uberti is in fact part of the Benelli group, in turn a member of the Beretta holding family.

== Gallery ==
Photos of various Uberti products
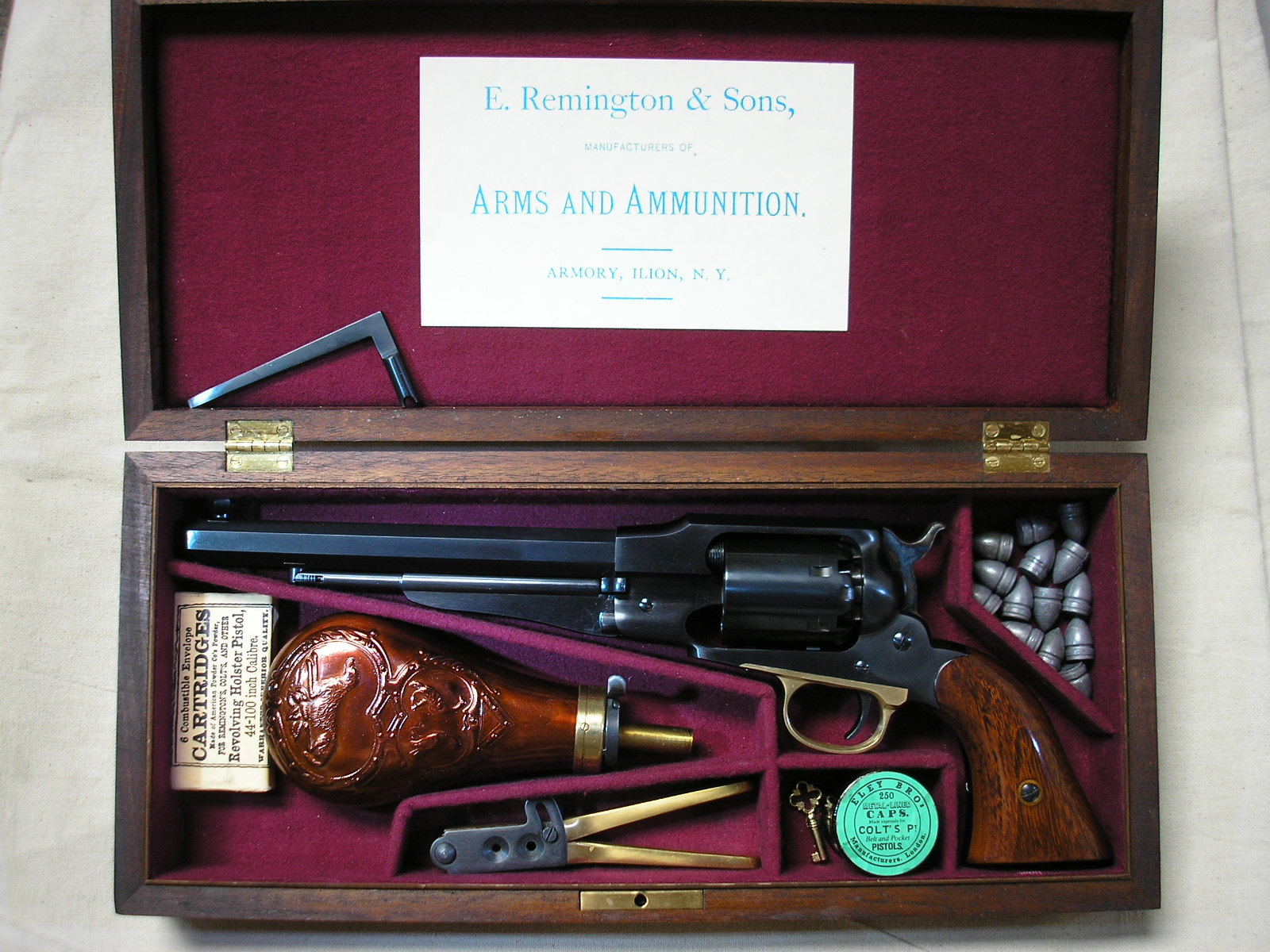
Remington New Model Army cased replica set

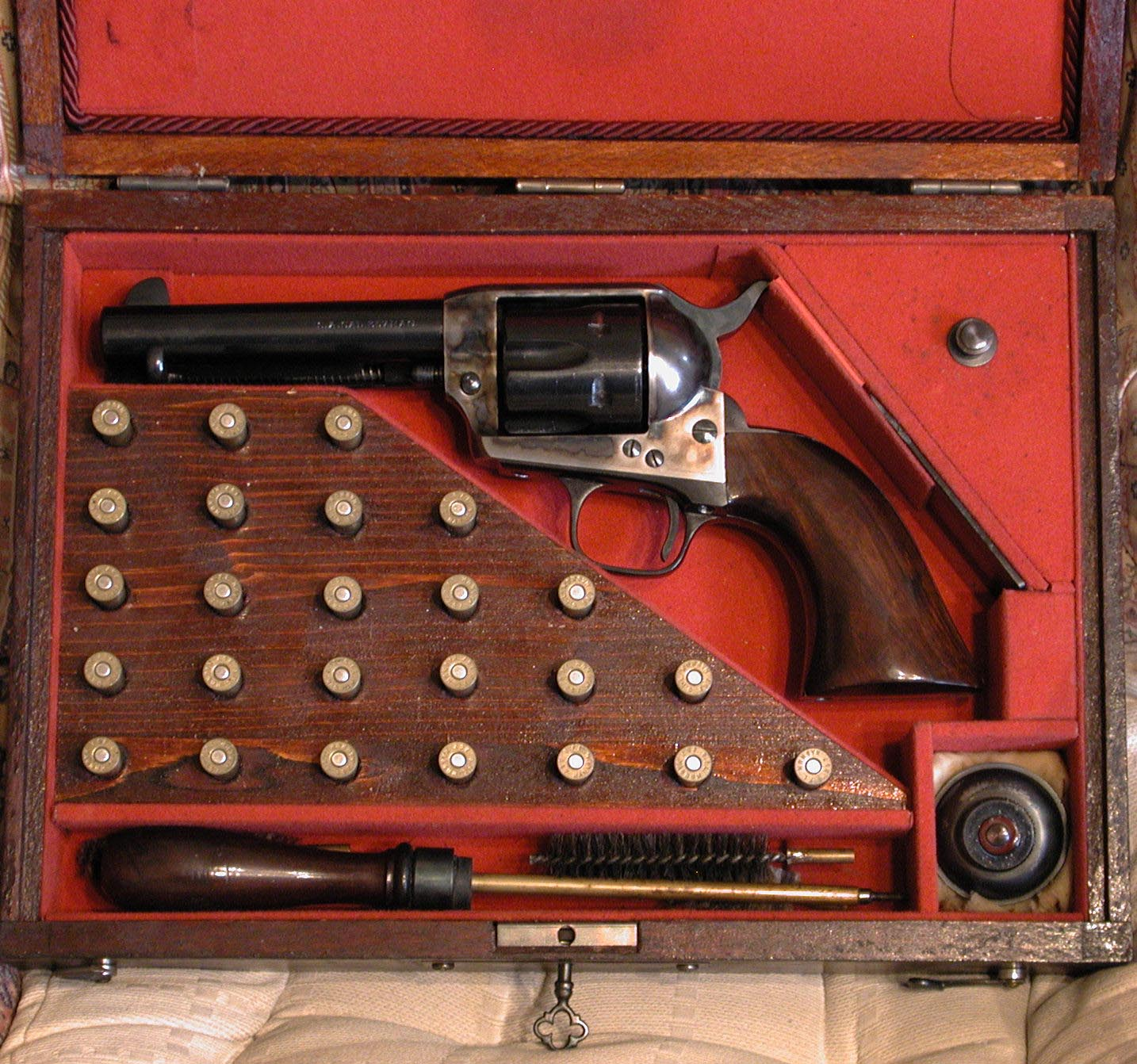
Colt Single Action cased set

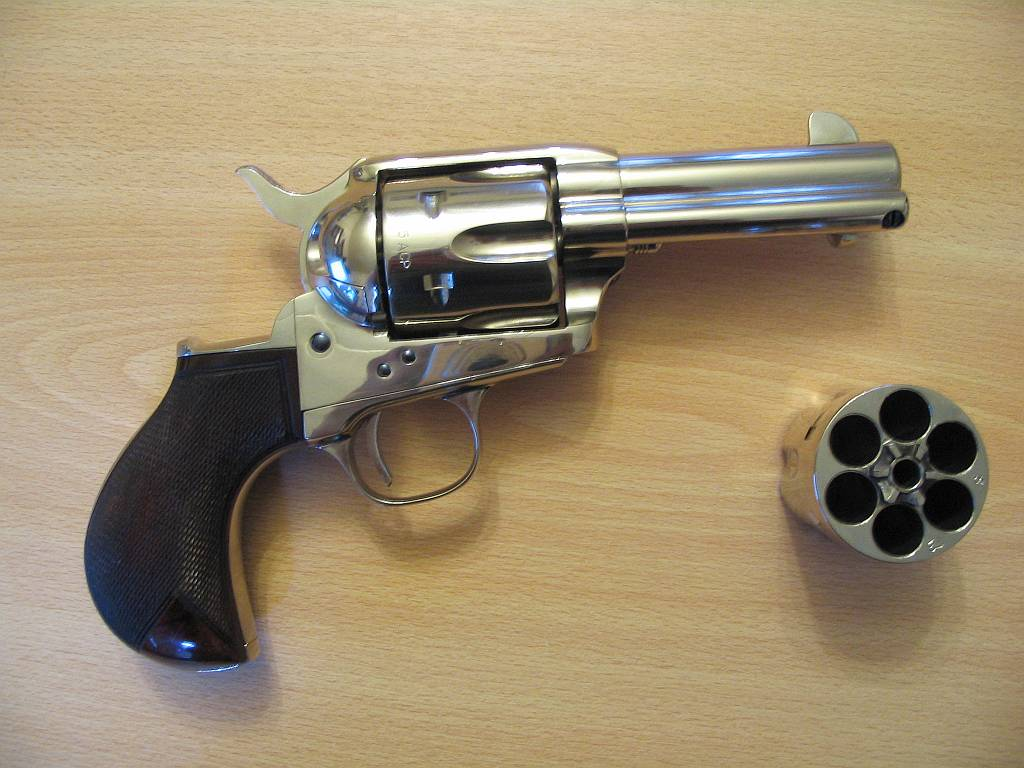
Colt Thunderer replica

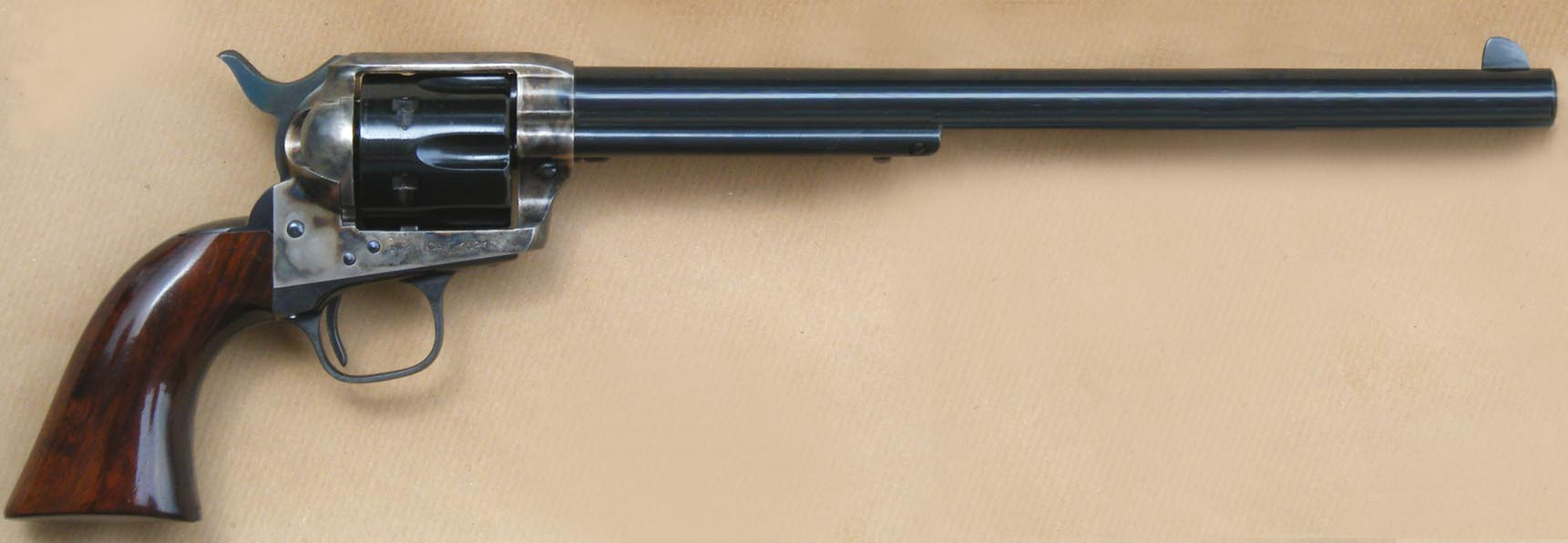
Colt Buntline revolver replica

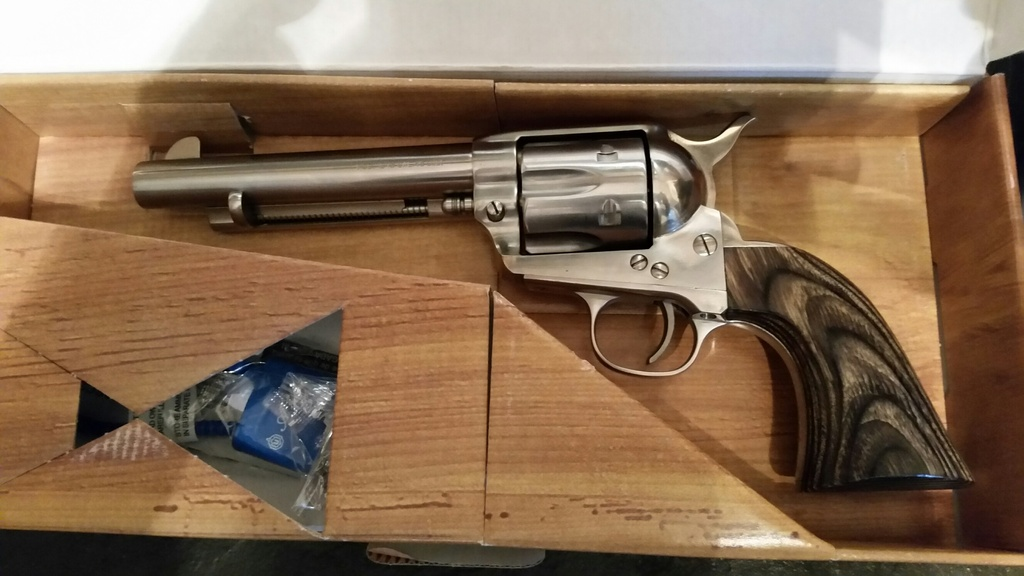
1873 Horseman single action revolver
