= Bridgeport rig =

Type of handgun holster

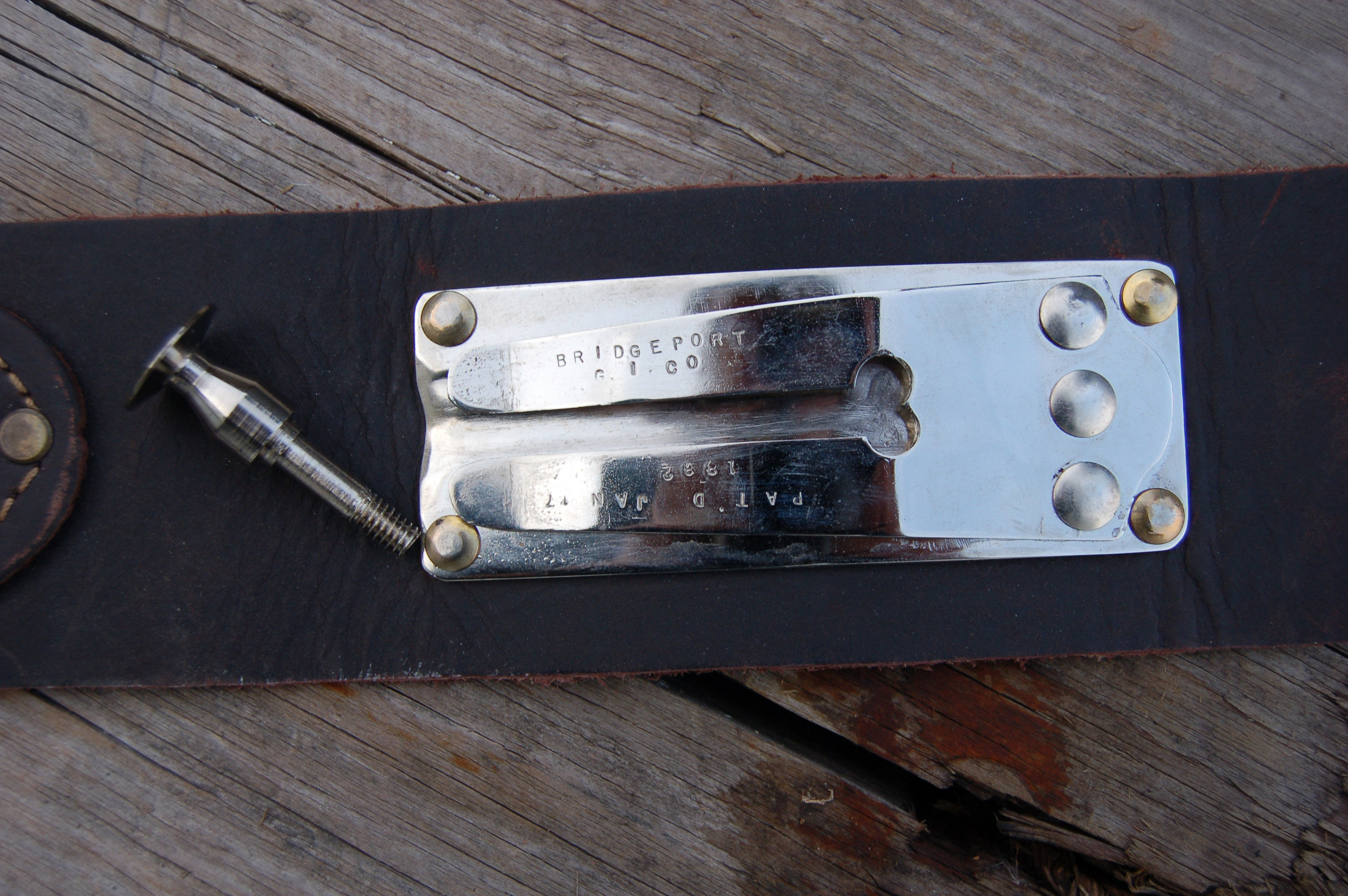
Replica Bridgeport Rig device and screw.

The Bridgeport rig is a quick draw or fast draw handgun holster that was developed in 1882. Today, the device enjoys cult status among cowboy action shooters and other antique gun enthusiasts.

== History ==
The Bridgeport rig was patented in 1882 by Louis S. Flatau, sheriff of Camp County, Texas.

Flatau envisioned mounting the item on a belt or a saddle. A modified hammer screw with a large head that protruded 3/4" from the frame would be installed on the Colt. This screw head would be inserted into the rig and held in place via a strip of spring steel that was attached to the gun belt via rivets. The shooter could rotate the revolver upward to fire without removing it from his belt if needed. These were fabricated by the Bridgeport Gun Implement Company of Bridgeport, Connecticut.

While the Flatau device was dismissed in military circles, it did enjoy limited acceptance among some frontier civilians, particularly peace officers and other professional gunmen who appreciated its speed of access. A common complaint was that the screw was easily damaged and it failed to protect the revolver from the elements.

Period photographs and scattered references indicate that the Bridgeport rig was used by some lawmen into the early 20th century. Elmer Keith wore a Bridgeport rig as did James B. Gillett when he was Marshall of El Paso, Texas, in the 1880s; it is sometimes referred to as the "Gillett rig" for this reason.

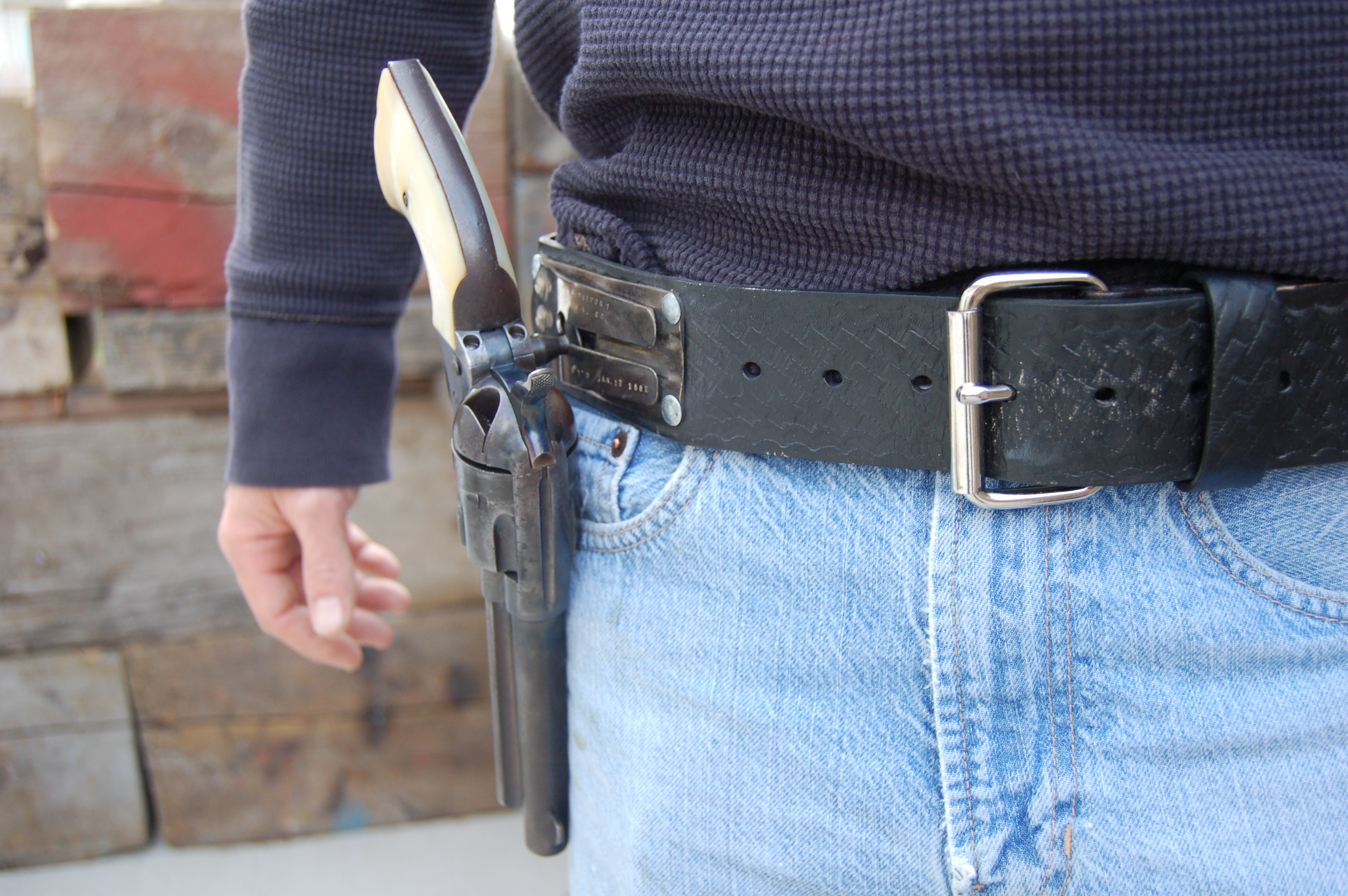
Colt Single Action Army held by a Bridgeport rig.

== Quotes ==
I had always worn a pistol in a belt holster, and I was used to drawing fast from that position…A little later, I put on a belt which carried two Colts without a holster…I could swing the gun muzzles up or down, and they were out of the way and at the same time ready for instant use. I could shoot the pistols — though I never had to — without drawing them, just as one shoots out of an open-toed swivel holster.

— James B. Gillett, Marshall of El Paso in the 1880s
