= Davide Pedersoli =

Italian firearms manufacturing company

Davide Pedersoli S.r.l.
- Company type: Società a responsabilità limitata
- Industry: Arms
- Founded: 1957
- Founder: Davide Pedersoli
- Headquarters: Gardone Val Trompia, Italy
- Products: Replica firearms
- Website: www.davidepedersoli.com

Davide Pedersoli S.r.l. is an Italian firearms manufacturing company based in Gardone Val Trompia, Italy, that was founded in 1957 by Davide Pedersoli.

Davide Pedersoli specializes in CNC-engineered black-powder weapon replicas for hunting, marksmanship and reenactment. Its weapons normally are more expensive than its competitors, but they have a reputation for precision and reliability.

In 2014, Davide Pedersoli went into partnership with three other Italian manufacturers (F.A.I.R, Sabatti, and a division of Tanfoglio called FT Italia) in order to better serve the United States firearms market. Italian Firearms Group, located in Amarillo, Texas, is the import, sales, marketing, and service hub for those companies in the United States.

== Models ==
Pedersoli's lineup includes American and European pattern muzzleloading rifles, muskets, and pistols (such as duelling pistols and Harper's Ferry pistols), as well as breechloading firearms such as Sharps rifles, double barrel shotguns, double rifles, an updated version of the Winchester Model 1886, Rolling Block rifles, and more.

== See also ==
- Chiappa Firearms
- A. Uberti, Srl.
