= U.S. Fire Arms Manufacturing Company =

American firearms manufacturer

U.S. Fire-Arms Manufacturing Co, Inc.
- Company type: Private
- Industry: Firearms
- Founded: 1993; 33 years ago
- Founder: Douglas Donnelly
- Defunct: 2017; 9 years ago
- Fate: Defunct
- Headquarters: Hartford, Connecticut, United States
- Key people: Douglas Donnelly (CEO, owner)
- Products: Firearms
- Number of employees: 23

United States Fire-Arms Manufacturing Company, Inc. (U.S. Fire Arms Mfg. Co., USFA) was a privately held firearms-manufacturing firm based in Hartford, Connecticut. Until 2011, United States Fire-Arms Manufacturing Company, Inc. was known for producing single action revolvers, which were clones of the Colt Single Action Army revolver. The factory was located "Under the Blue Dome", in the East Armory building of the former Colt Armory complex, where Colt's Manufacturing Company produced many of their classic firearms in the late 19th and early 20th centuries.

In 2011, the company ceased production of replica colt revolvers, and publicly rebranded itself as ZiPFactory.com, based on its titular USFA ZiP .22 firearm. The company formally dissolved in January 2017, and the company was the last firearms maker in the Colt's Armory Complex. The site is now seeking National Historic Landmark status.

== History ==
The company used to maintain an "Old Armory Custom Shop" which produced custom firearms to order. These firearms featured expensive traditional materials and techniques such as engraving or hand engraving, gold inlay, damascening, case hardening, polishing, and fine metal plating, or other finish.

USFA was the only firearm company still manufacturing in the city of Hartford, Connecticut, when it closed in 2011. Due to space limitations, the company built an additional production location outside of the Blue Dome in order to accommodate their CNC machinery.

USFA had an active role in firearms politics in the United States, and issued a statement on the District of Columbia v. Heller court decision on the interpretation of the Second Amendment.

In 2011, USFA abandoned their production of Colt revolver replicas and went to the exclusive manufacturing of their ZiP .22 pistol. The ZiP .22 proved to be an unreliable firearm and lacked consumer interest. As a result, USFA is now out of business.

== Products ==
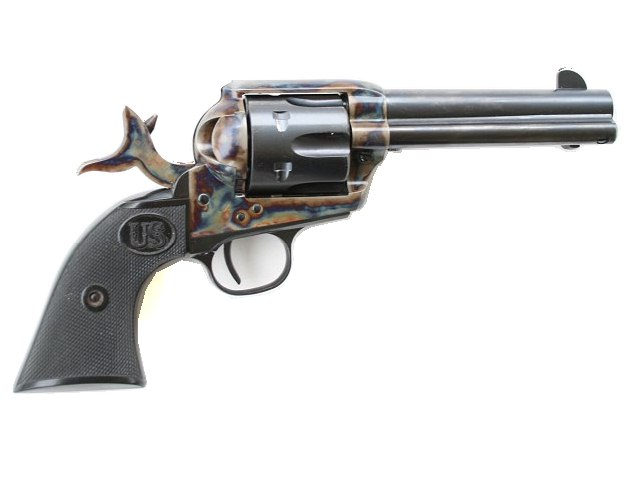
USFA Single Action Army cocked and ready to fire

USFA was best known for producing firearms based on the Colt Single Action Army revolver, Colt M1911 semi-automatic pistol, and rifles such as the Colt Lightning Carbine.

== Exhibitions ==
Through January 1, 2009, USFA guns were displayed in the exhibit Guns West! at the National Firearms Museum. A USFA Single Action Army revolver was given by United States Vice President Dick Cheney to the Buffalo Bill Historical Center in Cody, Wyoming.

USFA's 2007 SHOT Show exhibit in Orlando, Florida recalled an exhibit displayed at the 1876 Philadelphia, PA Centennial Exhibition in the same month George Armstrong Custer perished at Little Bighorn.

== Use in film ==
Hollywood firearms expert Thell Reed selected USFA to provide revolvers for several films for which he served as key armorer:

- 3:10 to Yuma (2007)
- The Assassination of Jesse James by the Coward Robert Ford (2007)
- Shanghai Noon (2000)

== See also ==
- Cowboy action shooting
- Historical reenactment
