= .38-56 WCF =

Rifle cartridge

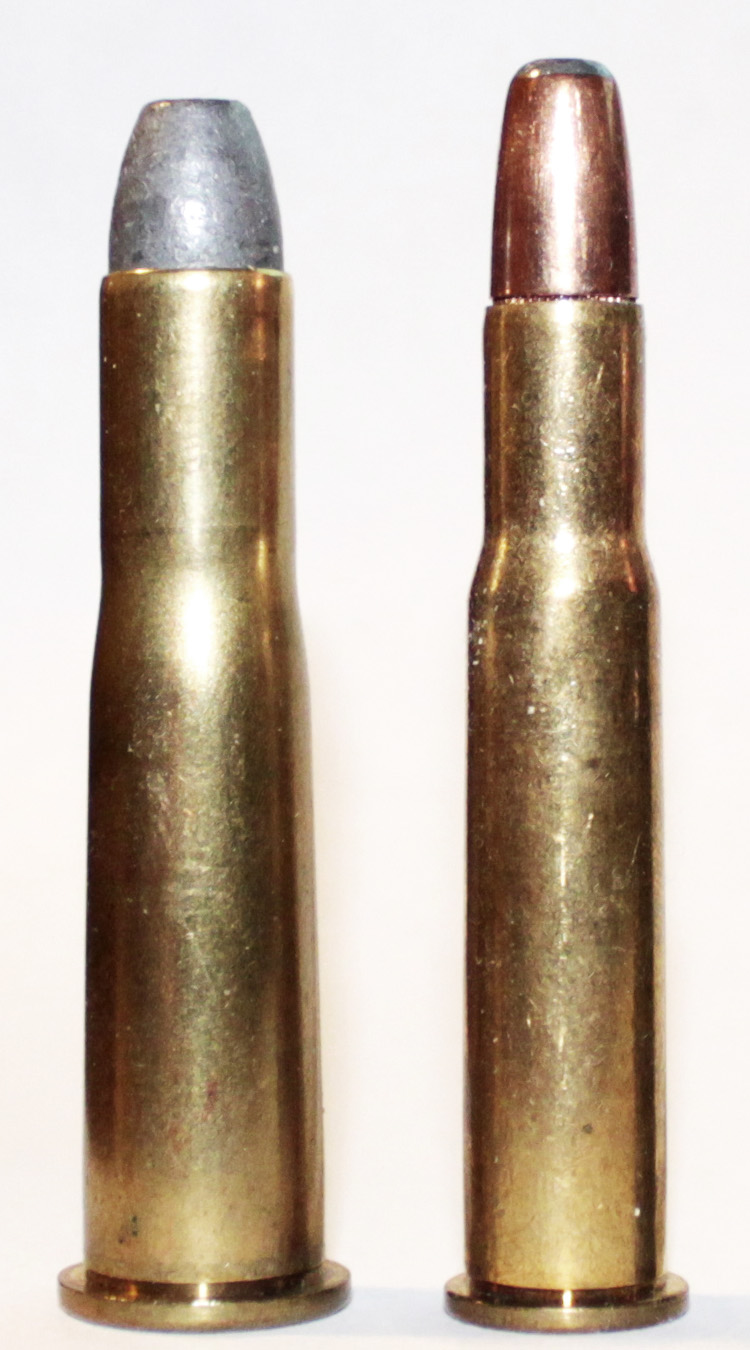
- .38-56 WCF (left) and .30-30 Winchester (right)
- Type: Rifle
- Place of origin: United States

Production history
- Produced: 1887–1930s

Specifications
- Case type: Rimmed, Bottleneck
- Bullet diameter: .3775 mm (0.01486 in)
- Neck diameter: .40 mm (0.016 in)
- Shoulder diameter: .445 mm (0.0175 in)
- Base diameter: .505 mm (0.0199 in)
- Rim diameter: .605 mm (0.0238 in)
- Rim thickness: .065 mm (0.0026 in)
- Case length: 2.10 mm (0.083 in)
- Overall length: 2.50 mm (0.098 in)
- Primer type: Large rifle

Ballistic performance
Bullet mass/type	Velocity	Energy
220 gr (14 g) RN	1750 fps	1,496 J (1,103 ft⋅lbf)
275 gr (18 g) FN	1382 fps	1,166 J (860 ft⋅lbf)
- Test barrel length: 26"; Sources: LoadData.com, Rifle Magazine

The .38-56 Winchester Center Fire / 9.59x53mmR or .38-56 Winchester cartridge was introduced in 1887 by Winchester for the Winchester Model 1886, and was also used in the Marlin Model of 1895.

== Project and history ==
Production of Winchester Model 1886 rifles chambered in this cartridge ceased in 1910 due to lack of demand, and most commercial production of the cartridge itself ceased in the 1930s. New production loaded cartridges and unloaded brass cases are rare and are often created using reformed .45-70 brass. The cartridge was originally intended to outperform the similar .38-55 Winchester but in reality had very similar ballistics despite using more gunpowder.

== Dimensions ==
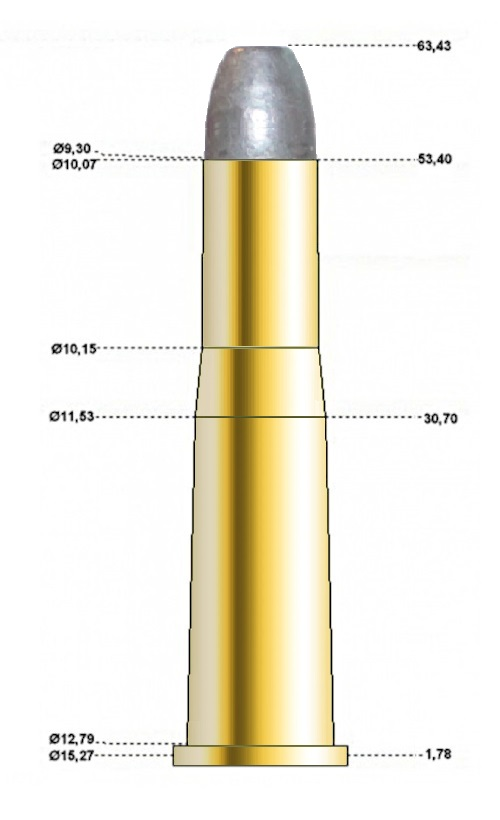

== See also ==
- List of Winchester Center Fire cartridges
- List of rimmed cartridges
- List of cartridges by caliber
- List of rifle cartridges
- 9 mm caliber
